= Avondale, Maryland =

Unincorporated community in Maryland, United States

Avondale
- Unincorporated community
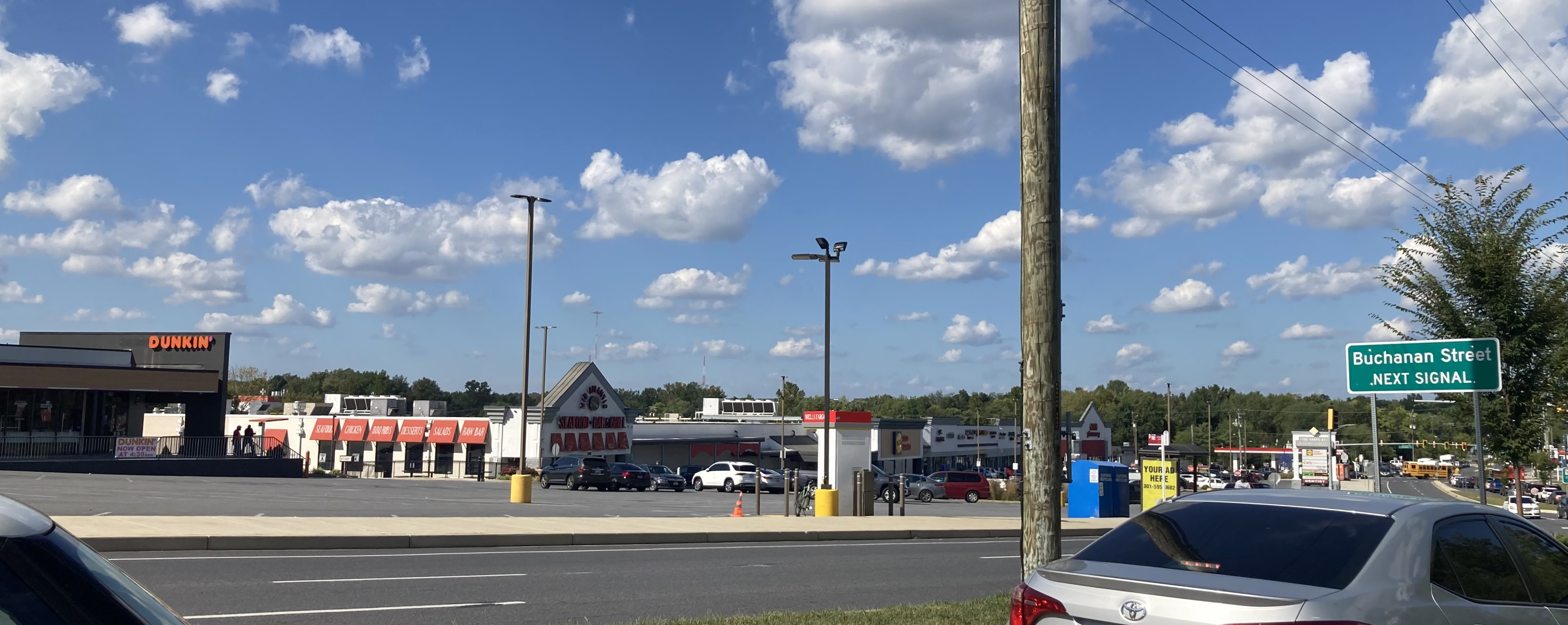
- The Shops at Queens Chillum in Avondale

- Location within the state of Maryland Avondale (the United States)
- Coordinates: 38°56′55″N 76°58′31″W
- Country: United States
- State: Maryland
- County: Prince George's
- Time zone: UTC−5 (Eastern (EST))
  - Summer (DST): UTC−4 (EDT)
- GNIS feature ID: 597031

Avondale is an unincorporated community in Prince George's County Maryland, United States. It is contained between Eastern Avenue NE to the south, Queens Chapel Road (MD-500) to the east, and the Northwest Branch Anacostia River to the north and west.

Avondale borders the neighborhoods of Hyattsville, Chillum, Green Meadows, and Mount Rainier in Prince George's County, Maryland. In addition to these neighborhoods in Prince George's County, Avondale also borders the North Michigan Park neighborhood of Northeast Washington D.C.

The Avondale neighborhood consists of three small subdivisions since being established: Avondale, Avondale Terrace, and North Avondale.

For statistical purposes, Avondale is part of the Chillum census-designated place (CDP), even though Avondale is actually a completely separate neighborhood from Chillum.

== History ==
The settlement of Avondale began in the late 1930s as a small residential subdivision at the intersection of Eastern Avenue and Queens Chapel Road.

In the 1930s, area development spread west from Hyattsville, Mount Rainier, and Brentwood. Developers of the Avondale neighborhood promoted the area's very close proximity to Washington D.C. as well as its already established utility supplies.

Construction of the Avondale Grove subdivision began in 1939. By 1942, the community contained approximately 100 structures located along eight streets on a wedge-shaped tract. At the southwest tip of the subdivision, Carson Circle, the community's entryway, forms a quarter-circle between the Avondale boundary streets of Queens Chapel Road and LaSalle Road. The interior roads of the subdivision radiate northward from Carson Circle. Along these streets are houses constructed in the 1940s and 1950s and included within subdivisions named Avondale Terrace and North Avondale.

In the 1960s, the Avondale area along Queens Chapel Road was developed. Three high-density apartment complexes were constructed on Queens Chapel Road, Kings Park Plaza, Queens Park Plaza, and Avondale Overlook. The other apartment complexes in Avondale, such as La Salle Park, Avondale Park, and Manor Apartments, were developed shortly after.

The Washington Metropolitan Area Transit Agency (WMATA) originally had a plan to construct the "Chillum" Metro Station on Chillum Road in Avondale in 1955. WMATA scrapped that plan in 1978 due to strong opposition from many residents living in the Avondale Chillum neighborhoods and in the Kirkwood Apartments in Hyattsville. They did not want their houses, apartment complexes, neighborhood parks, playgrounds, trails, and schools to be displaced or significantly disrupted. Prince George's County and many environmentalists also opposed the plan because it would have significantly disrupted a lot of park land and many native plant and animal species living in those parks.

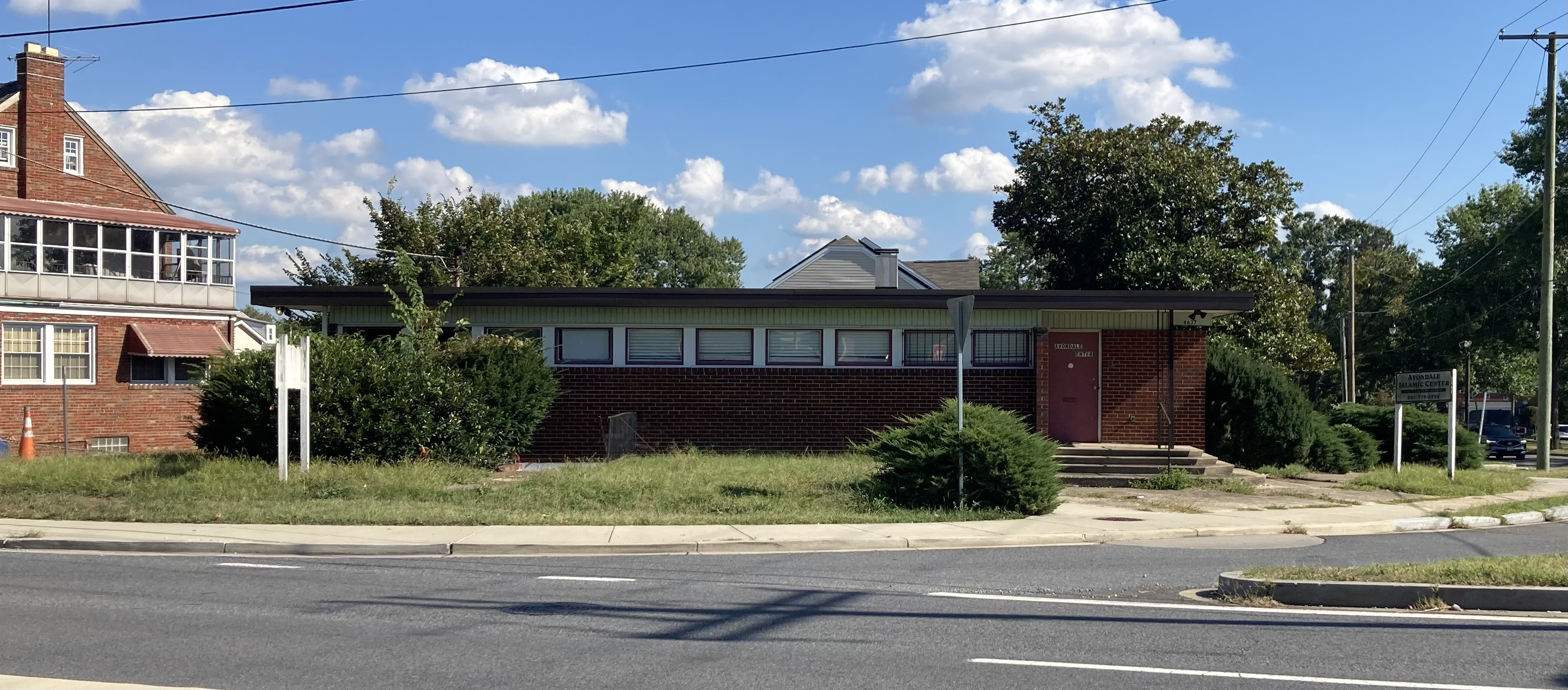
The Avondale Islamic Center, a mosque in Avondale, Chillum, Maryland.

In 1985, WMATA decided that it would be much better instead to have the Metro Station located at the former site of the former drive-in theater site and Palmer Ford Warehouse in Hyattsville. As a result of this decision, WMATA decided to name the station "West Hyattsville". Even though construction of the Green Line train tracks between the Fort Totten and West Hyattsville Metro Stations was supposed to begin in 1986 and have been completed by the end of 1990, construction of the Green Line train tracks between the two stations was delayed until 1990 and was only completed on December 11, 1993, due to the lack of funding available during the time.

In 1931, De La Salle College–a religious study house for the Roman Catholic teaching order Christian Brothers–was opened. The study house building now houses the Redemptoris Mater Archdiocesan Missionary Seminary of Washington. The Avondale Neighbourhood Park was established on some of this property.

In 1962, Avondale became home to the St. Ann's Infant and Maternity Home operated by the Roman Catholic Archdiocese of Washington. Now the St. Ann's Center for Children, Youth and Families, it also houses St. Ann's Catholic High School.

== Commerce ==
The Shops at Queens Chillum

The main shopping center serving the Avondale neighborhood is located at the corner of Queens Chapel Road and Chillum Road.

This shopping center's primary tenant was a Giant Food Store from 1954 to April 4, 2013. This Giant Food Store was supposedly one of the first Giant Food stores to open in the Washington D.C. metropolitan area. It was even referred to as "A Historic Giant": a reference to the fact that Queen Elizabeth II and Prince Philip stopped at this Giant in 1957 when returning to the White House after attending a football game with President Eisenhower at the University of Maryland College Park campus.

The Giant was the main tenant of the shopping center for roughly six decades. For many years, it had been the only convenient location for many senior citizens and longtime residents of Avondale and Mount Rainier to buy groceries. This Giant would finally close its doors on April 4, 2013.

Chillum Shopping Center

The second shopping center serving the Avondale neighborhood is located directly behind the Shops at Queens Chillum Shopping Center is the Chillum Shopping Center.. WMATA's Green Line route passes this shopping center when traveling between the West Hyattsville and Fort Totten stations.

== Parks and recreation ==
Avondale Neighborhood Park is located at the intersection of La Salle Road and Ingraham Street, just north of the Maryland-Washington D.C. line (Eastern Avenue NE). This park is located next to the NMS Hyattsville Health Care Facility, De La Salle College, Manor Apartments, Avondale Park Apartments, St. Ann's Catholic High School. This is the main neighborhood park in the community of Avondale. This park consists of a small picnic pavilion area, kickball/ baseball field, small basketball court, small-size playground, and a tennis court.

Chillum Community Park is located between Avondale and Chillum. Only the side of Chillum Community Park east of the Northwest Branch Anacostia River is located in Avondale's northwest side at the intersection of Chillum Road and 18th Avenue. The side of Chillum Community Park located west of the Northwest Branch Anacostia River is located in Chillum at the intersection of 16th Avenue and Ray Road. The side of Chillum Community Park that is located in Avondale consists of a very small playground area, a small picnic pavilion area, and a small basketball court. The side of Chillum Community Park that is located in Chillum also consists of a very small playground area and small picnic pavilion area like the Avondale side of Chillum Community Park, with the exception that it contains a small soccer field rather than a small basketball court.

== Trails ==
- Northwest Branch Trail is a 21-mile (34 km) multi-use trail that passes through Avondale. The trail follows along the Northwest Branch of the Anacostia River. It is part of the Rachel Carson Greenway and the Anacostia Tributary Trail System. One of its ends in located in Layhill, and other end is in Bladensburg.
