= Maryland Route 208 =

State highway in Maryland, United States

Maryland Route 208
- Maryland Route 208 highlighted in red

Route information
- Maintained by MDSHA and Town of Brentwood
- Length: 1.86 mi (2.99 km)
- Existed: 1927–present

Major junctions
- South end: US 1 Alt. in Cottage City
- US 1 in Brentwood
- North end: MD 500 in Hyattsville

Location
- Country: United States
- State: Maryland
- Counties: Prince George's

Highway system
- Maryland highway system; Interstate; US; State; Scenic Byways
← MD 206	→ MD 210

Maryland Route 208 (MD 208) is a state highway in the U.S. state of Maryland. The highway runs 1.86 miles (2.99 km) from U.S. Route 1 Alternate (US 1 Alt.) in Cottage City north to MD 500 in Hyattsville. MD 208 connects the northwestern Prince George's County suburbs of Cottage City, Colmar Manor, Brentwood, and Hyattsville. The highway was built in the late 1910s and early 1920s and originally passed through Mount Rainier. The portion of MD 208 between US 1 Alt. and US 1 was originally MD 206; the northern portion of the highway was originally part of MD 209 and then MD 410. MD 208 was extended north to MD 500 and removed from Mount Rainier in the late 1950s, and extended south through Cottage City around 1970.

== Route description ==
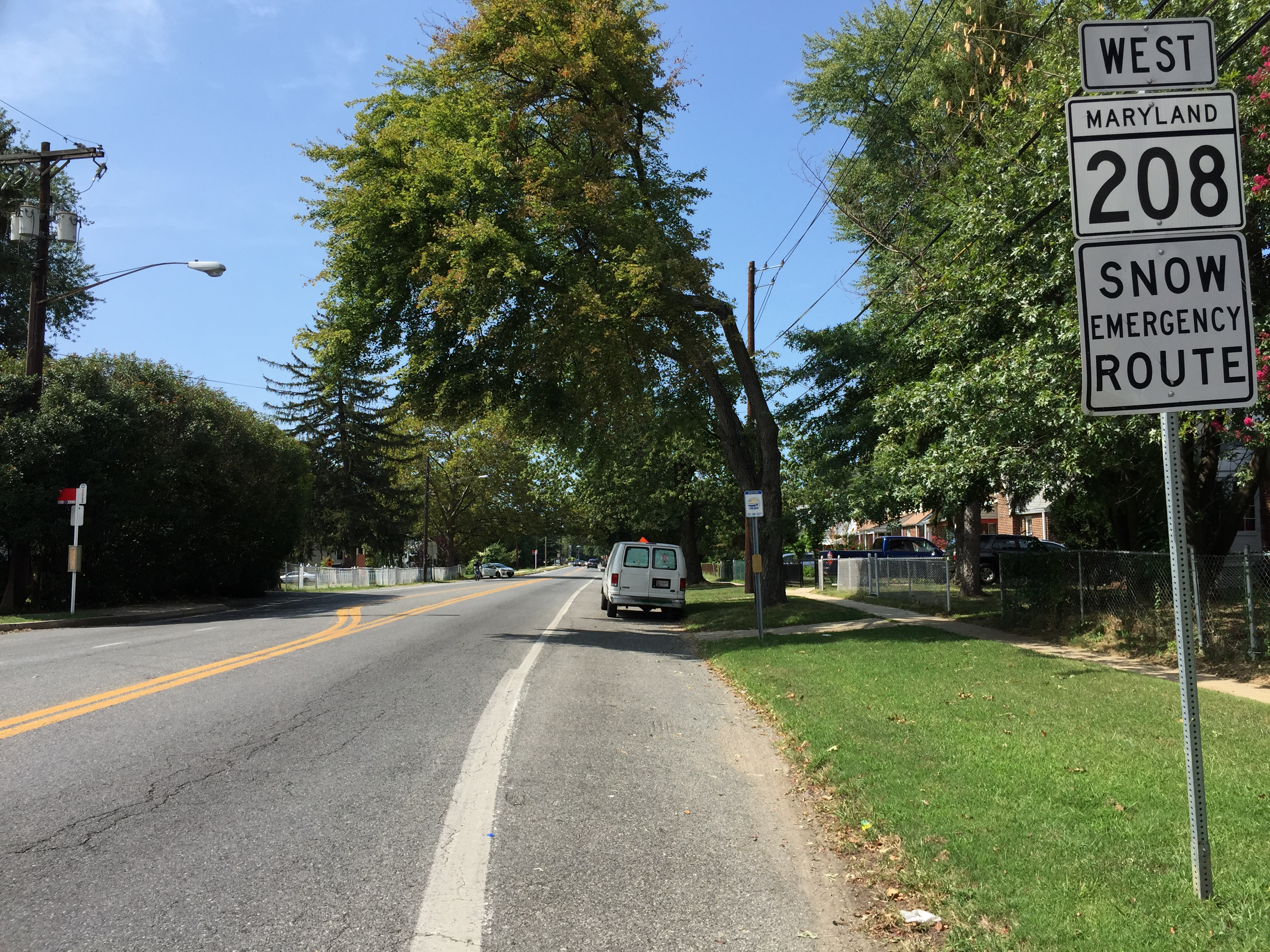
View west along MD 208 in Hyattsville

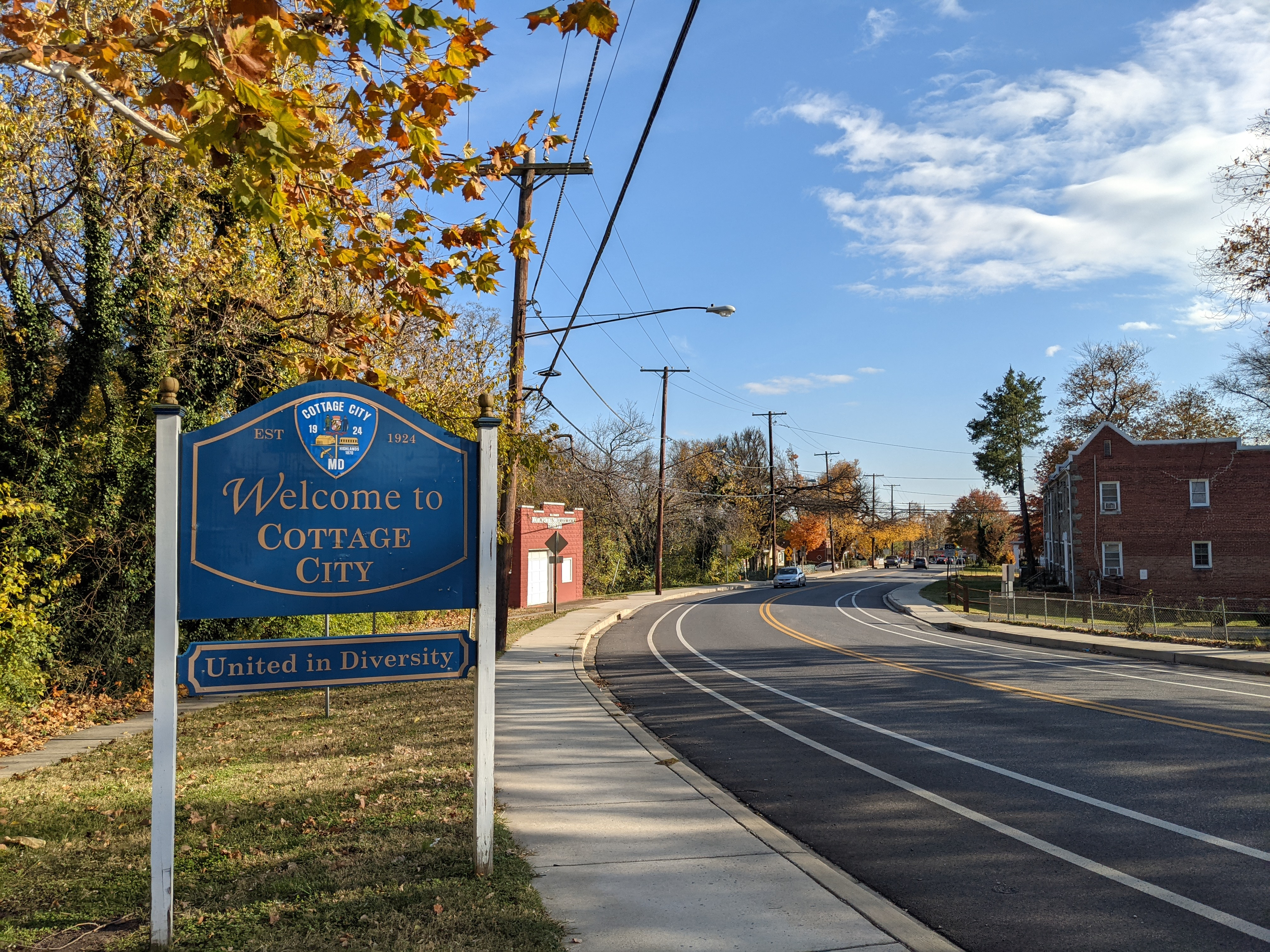
MD 208 heading east through Cottage City

MD 208 begins as 38th Avenue as its intersection with US 1 Alt. (Bladensburg Road), which forms the border between the towns of Cottage City and Colmar Manor. The state highway heads northwest as a two-lane undivided road through Cottage City and crosses over CSX's Capital Subdivision railroad line, which carries MARC's Camden Line. At the railroad bridge, MD 208 enters the town of Brentwood and its name changes to 38th Street, which intersects US 1 (Rhode Island Avenue). The highway continues north through Brentwood as a municipally-maintained street. State maintenance resumes at MD 208's bridge across the Northwest Branch Anacostia River, where the highway leaves Brentwood and enters the city of Hyattsville. There, the state highway turns west onto Hamilton Street. MD 208 expands to a four-lane undivided highway shortly before it reaches its northern terminus at MD 500 (Queens Chapel Road). Hamilton Avenue continues straight to provide access to Ager Road and the West Hyattsville station on the Washington Metro's Green Line.

Though the road is inventoried as running north and south by the Maryland State Highway Administration and is signed as such at its intersection with US 1 Alt., most of the route is signed as west and east.

== History ==
Maryland Route 206
- Location: Cottage City–Brentwood
- Existed: 1927–1970

The first portion of what is now MD 208 was paved between Bladensburg Road and Rhode Island Avenue between 1916 and 1919. This 1-mile-long (1.6 km) concrete road included Rhode Island Avenue from 38th Street to 34th Street in Mount Rainier and part of 34th Street to the north. The segment of 38th Street between US 1 and US 1 Alt. was originally part of MD 206. By 1921, the concrete road was extended north to Hamilton Street. The portion of Hamilton Street from 38th Street west to Queens Chapel Road was paved in concrete by 1923. MD 208 originally began in Mount Rainier at Rhode Island Avenue, which was MD 411 before it became part of US 1. The highway followed 34th Street north to Taylor Street, followed that east into Brentwood to 37th Street, took that north to Windom Road, and rejoined the modern route of MD 208 at 38th Street.

The portion of Hamilton Street now used by MD 208 was originally part of MD 209. By 1946, MD 209 was replaced with an eastward extension of MD 410. This portion of Hamilton Street was widened and resurfaced with bituminous concrete in 1949. MD 208 itself was widened and resurfaced along its entire length in 1954. MD 208's modern bridge across the Baltimore and Ohio Railroad (now CSX) was built in 1954 and 1955. The highway's bridge across Northwest Branch, which had been built in 1932, was raised to a higher level in 1956. When MD 410 was relocated to its present alignment through Riverdale Park in 1956, MD 208 was extended west to its present terminus at MD 500. MD 208 was removed from Mount Rainier in favor of its present route through Brentwood by 1960. MD 208 was extended south along the route of MD 206 in 1970.

== Junction list ==
The entire route is in Prince George's County.

Location	mi	km	Destinations	Notes
Cottage City	0.00	0.00	US 1 Alt. (Baltimore Avenue) to MD 450 – Bladensburg, Hyattsville	Southern terminus
Brentwood	0.40	0.64	US 1 (Rhode Island Avenue) – Hyattsville, Mount Rainier	
Hyattsville	1.86	2.99	MD 500 (Queens Chapel Road) / Hamilton Street west – Hyattsville, Mount Rainier	Northern terminus
1.000 mi = 1.609 km; 1.000 km = 0.621 mi
