= MD 500 =

MD 500 may refer to:

- Maryland Route 500, a state highway in the United States
- McDonnell Douglas MD 500 Defender, a light multi-role military helicopter
- MD Helicopters MD 500, a family of light utility civilian and military helicopters
