= Maryland Route 501 =

State highway in Maryland, United States

Maryland Route 501
- Chillum Road

Route information
- Maintained by MDSHA
- Length: 1.68 mi (2.70 km)
- Existed: 1933–present

Major junctions
- West end: MD 212 in Chillum
- East end: MD 500 in Mount Rainier

Location
- Country: United States
- State: Maryland
- Counties: Prince George's

Highway system
- Maryland highway system; Interstate; US; State; Scenic Byways
← MD 500	→ MD 506

Maryland Route 501 (MD 501) is a state highway in the U.S. state of Maryland. Known as Chillum Road, the state highway runs 1.68 miles (2.70 km) from MD 212 in Chillum east to MD 500 in Mount Rainier. MD 501, which is the main east–west highway through Chillum in northwestern Prince George's County, was constructed in the early 1930s.

== Route description ==
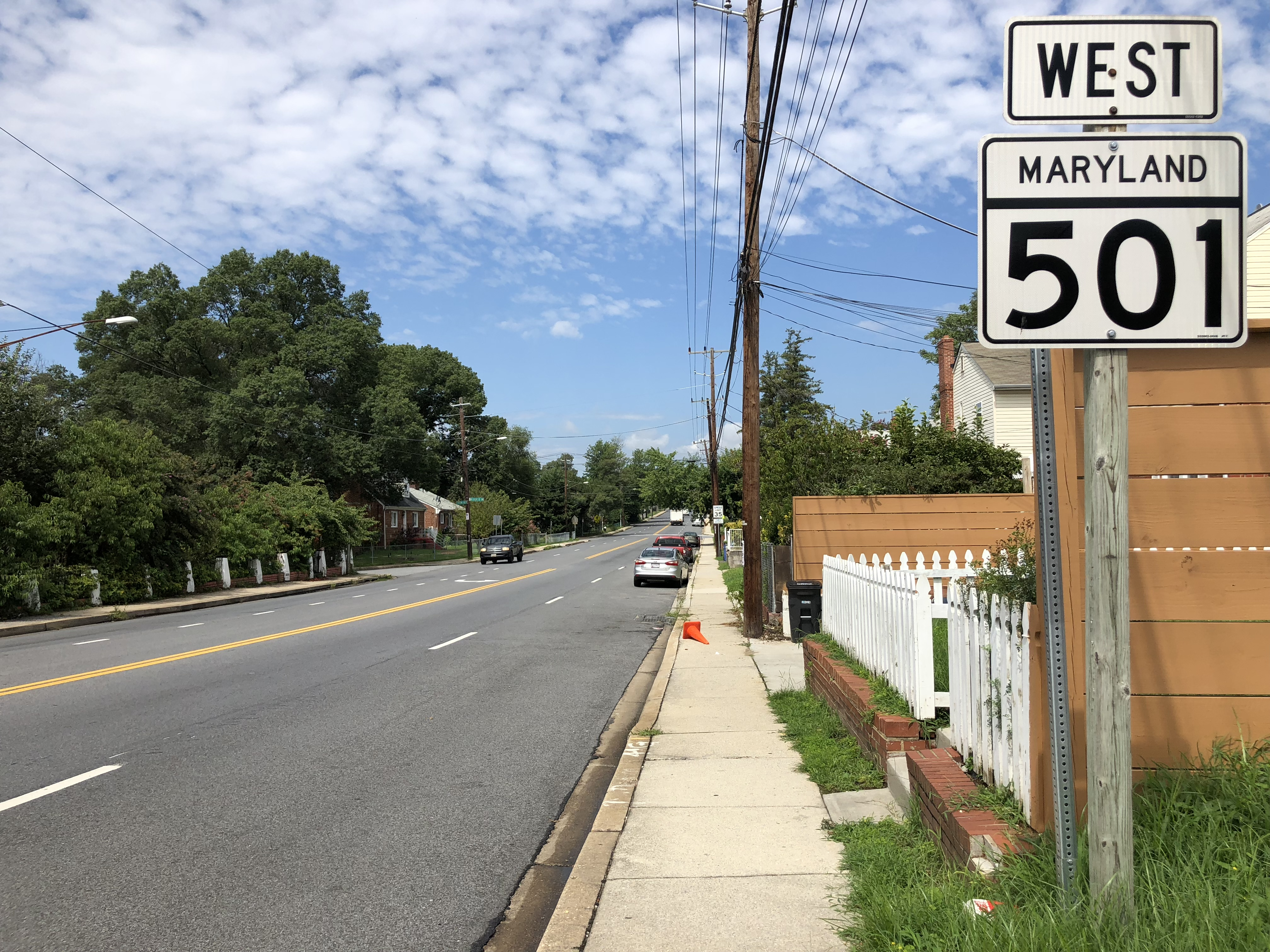
View west along MD 501 at Sargent Road in Chillum

MD 501 begins at an intersection with MD 212 (Riggs Road) in Chillum. Chillum Road continues west as a two-lane undivided county highway toward New Hampshire Avenue just inside the District of Columbia boundary. MD 501 heads southeast as a four-lane undivided highway that intersects Sargent Road and crosses a branch of the Northwest Branch Anacostia River. The highway begins to parallel Northwest Branch and passes under the Green Line of the Washington Metro just south of the West Hyattsville station. MD 501 reaches its eastern terminus at MD 500 (Queens Chapel Road) at the city limits of Mount Rainier. Chillum Road continues east into the city as a two-lane undivided street that curves south and becomes 34th Street.

== History ==
MD 501 was paved as a concrete road between 1930 and 1933. The highway was widened with a pair of 3.5-foot-wide (1.1 m) bituminous shoulders between 1940 and 1942. A new bridge was built for MD 501 across the branch of Northwest Branch in 1951. This bridge was replaced with one wide enough for the present four-lane road in 1968.

== Junction list ==
The entire route is in Prince George's County.

Location	mi	km	Destinations	Notes
Chillum	0.00	0.00	MD 212 (Riggs Road) / Chillum Road west – Langley Park, Washington	Western terminus
Mount Rainier	1.68	2.70	MD 500 (Queens Chapel Road) / Chillum Road east – Hyattsville, Washington	Eastern terminus
1.000 mi = 1.609 km; 1.000 km = 0.621 mi
