= Maryland Route 500 =

Highway in Maryland

Maryland Route 500
- Queens Chapel Road

Route information
- Maintained by MDSHA
- Length: 2.22 mi (3.57 km)
- Existed: 1933–present

Major junctions
- South end: Michigan Avenue at the District of Columbia boundary in Avondale
- MD 501 in Mount Rainier; MD 208 in Hyattsville
- North end: MD 410 in Hyattsville

Location
- Country: United States
- State: Maryland
- Counties: Prince George's

Highway system
- Maryland highway system; Interstate; US; State; Scenic Byways
← MD 497	→ MD 501

Maryland Route 500 (MD 500) is a state highway in the U.S. state of Maryland. The highway starts at the District of Columbia boundary at Avondale. It is a continuation of Washington D.C.'s Michigan Avenue. As Queens Chapel Road, MD 500 continues north for 2.22 miles (3.57 km) to MD 410 (East-West Highway) in Hyattsville.

MD 500 connects Washington with the Prince George's County cities of Mount Rainier and Hyattsville. The state highway also proximately connects those communities with a pair of subway stations (West Hyattsville and Hyattsville Crossing) on the Green Line of the Washington Metro.

Queens Chapel Road was originally constructed as MD 210 from Washington to Hyattsville in the 1910s. In the early 1930s, MD 500 was built from Hyattsville through University Park to U.S. Route 1 (US 1). MD 500 assumed the course of MD 210 in the mid-1940s. In the early 1950s, the highway was relocated in West Hyattsville and expanded to a divided highway between West Hyattsville and the Washington boundary line. It was later expanded again between West Hyattsville and University Park.

In the late 1980s, MD 500 was truncated at MD 410 when University Park took over the highway prior to the construction of the Metro Green Line underneath the town. The portion of Queens Chapel Road that ran through University Park became a local neighborhood road.

== Route description ==
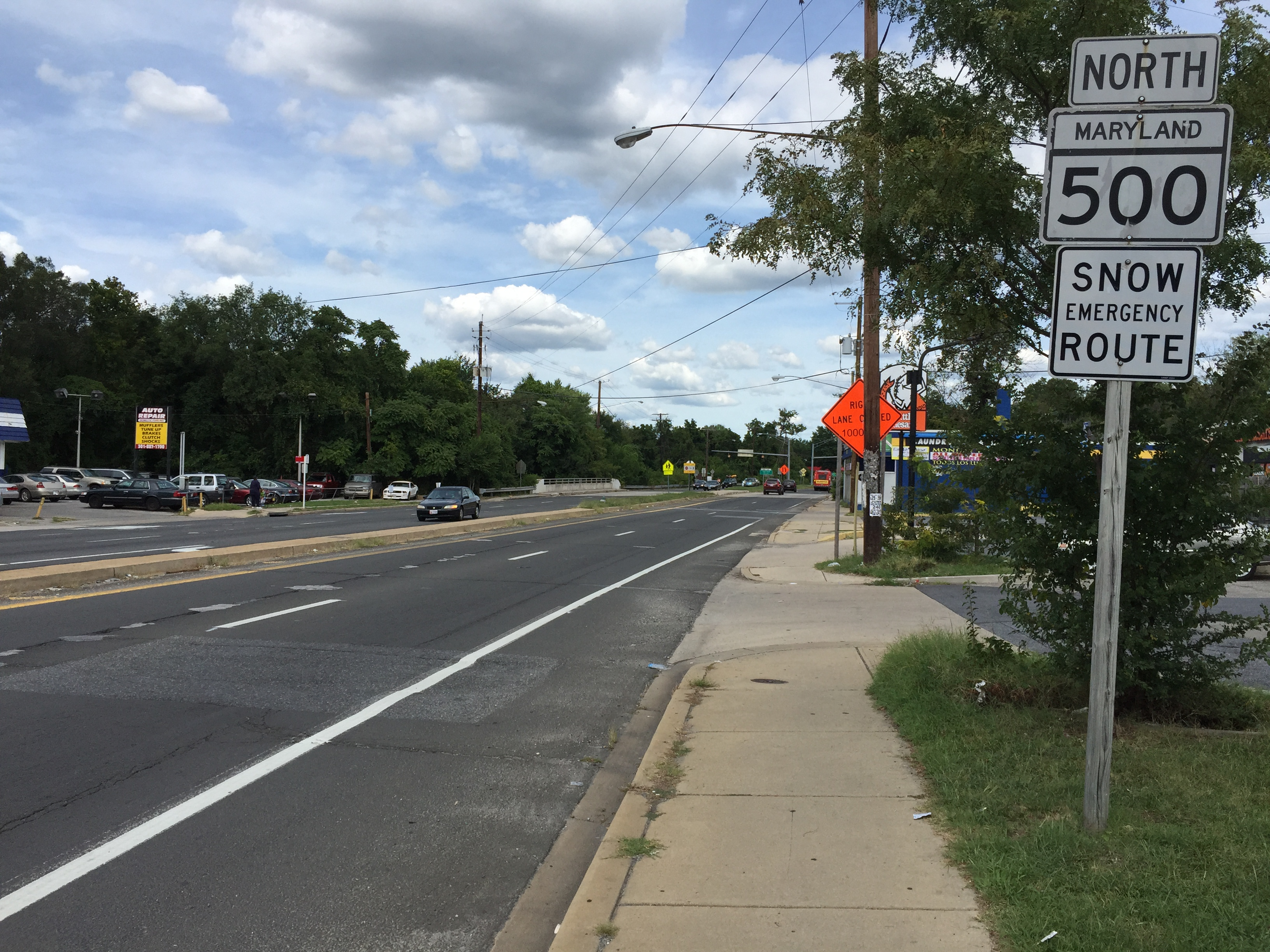
View north along MD 500 at MD 501 in Mount Rainier

MD 500 begins in Maryland at an intersection with Eastern Avenue at the District of Columbia boundary in Avondale, Maryland. In Washington D.C., the road becomes Michigan Avenue. In Maryland, MD 500 heads northeast as a four-lane divided highway. The highway veers north and forms the western boundary of Mount Rainier as the highway intersects Chillum Road, which heads west as MD 501. MD 500 then crosses the Northwest Branch Anacostia River and, veering northeast, enters the city of Hyattsville. Here, Ager Road splits to the north and can be taken to the West Hyattsville station on the Washington Metro's Green Line. To reach northbound MD 500 from southbound Ager Road, one must take Hamilton Avenue between the two roads. Hamilton Street heads east as MD 208. MD 500 continues northeast through the intersection with Queensbury Road and Belcrest Road, the latter providing access to the Hyattsville Crossing station on the Green Line. MD 500 then reaches its northern terminus at the intersection of MD 410 (East–West Highway) and county-maintained Adelphi Road. On the other side of this intersection, Queens Chapel Road–no longer MD 500 and with no direct access from MD 500–continues north as a neighborhood street.

== History ==
Queens Chapel Road is named for the Queen's Chapel, a Catholic church founded in 1722 in Prince George's County, Maryland, on the estate of the Queen family. As of 1801, with the establishment of the District of Columbia, that land has been located in what is now the Langdon neighborhood of Washington D.C. In addition to the extant portion of Queens Chapel Road in Maryland, the road continued into the District of Columbia along what are now Michigan Avenue and 18th Street to Brentwood Road just north of US 1 in the city's Brookland neighborhood.

By 1915, the Maryland segment of Queens Chapel Road from the District of Columbia boundary to just south of Ager Road was paved as a 14-foot-wide (4.3 m) concrete road by Prince George's County with state aid. The pavement was extended to Ager Road when that road and Hamilton Street were paved by the Maryland State Roads Commission in 1923.

The segment of Queens Chapel Road from Hamilton Street to US 1 in University Park was paved in concrete between 1930 and 1933.

Maryland Route 210
- Location: Chillum–Hyattsville
- Existed: 1927–c. 1946

The portion of Queens Chapel Road south of Ager Road was originally designated MD 210, whereas the portion north of Hamilton Street was MD 500. The portion of modern Queens Chapel Road between these two points did not exist. Instead, Queens Chapel Road turned north (now Jamestown Road); made a sharp curve east (now Hamilton Street); at a T-intersection with Ager Road continued east; and finally at another T-intersection turned north and became MD 500. Hamilton Street continued east into Hyattsville.

Maryland Route 209
- Location: Chillum–Hyattsville
- Existed: 1927–c. 1946

At that time, Ager Road, Hamilton Street, and the portion of Queens Chapel Road connecting them were part of former MD 209. By 1946, this portion of road was renumbered as an extension of MD 410, and MD 210 was renumbered as an extension of MD 500.

By 1942, the Maryland State Roads Commission proposed relocating Queens Chapel Road near the Northwest Branch to eliminate the highway's circuitous course. In 1949, this proposed relatively straight stretch of roadway was constructed between Hamilton Street and an extended Ager Road, becoming MD 500 along with the former MD 210.

In 1951 and 1952, MD 500, from the Northwest Branch to the District of Columbia, was expanded to a divided 4-lane roadway. This work included rebuilding the highway's bridge across Northwest Branch to carry the expanded highway. In addition, the remainder of MD 500 from Hamilton Street to US 1 was widened (though not divided) and resurfaced.

In 1973, MD 500, from Hamilton Street to MD 410, was converted to a six-lane divided highway. In 2005, this same stretch of MD 500 was reduced from six lanes to four lanes by lane restriping.

In August 1988, preceding the construction of the Washington Metro Green Line underneath University Park, the Maryland State Highway Administration transferred to the town maintenance of Queens Chapel Road from MD 410 to US 1. During subway construction, that portion of the road was closed to through traffic.

A 1991 traffic study showed that the majority of traffic along the University Park segment of Queens Chapel Road had been through-traffic before it was closed. It recommended that the highway be permanently closed at the southern end of town at the MD 410 intersection and that only local town traffic be allowed onto US 1. After Metro construction was completed in the summer of 1992, the University Park Town Council elected to keep the road closed to through traffic, and this measure was affirmed by a town referendum in January 1993. Today, a cul-de-sac exists at the southwest end of town adjacent to the MD 500–MD 410 intersection. At the northeast end of the town, the intersection with US 1 only allows local traffic to exit to Queens Chapel Road.

== Junction list ==
The entire route is in Prince George's County.

Location	mi	km	Destinations	Notes
Avondale	0.00	0.00	Eastern Avenue / Michigan Avenue west – Washington	District of Columbia boundary; southern terminus
Mount Rainier	0.74	1.19	MD 501 west (Chillum Road) / Chillum Road east	Eastern terminus of MD 501
Hyattsville	1.16	1.87	MD 208 south (Hamilton Street) / Hamilton Street west – Brentwood	Northern terminus of MD 208
Hyattsville	2.22	3.57	MD 410 (East–West Highway) / Adelphi Road north – Takoma Park, Riverdale Park, University Park	Northern terminus
1.000 mi = 1.609 km; 1.000 km = 0.621 mi
