= Green Meadows, Maryland =

Unincorporated community in Maryland, United States

Green Meadows
- Unincorporated community
- Location within the state of Maryland Green Meadows (the United States)
- Coordinates: 38°58′3″N 76°58′43″W
- Country: United States of America
- State: Maryland
- County: Prince George's
- Time zone: UTC-5 (Eastern (EST))
  - Summer (DST): UTC-4 (EDT)
- GNIS feature ID: 597490

Green Meadows is an unincorporated community in Prince George's County, Maryland, United States. For statistical purposes, it is part of the Chillum census-designated place (CDP).

== Geography ==
Green Meadows is contained between the Northwest Branch Anacostia River to the east, East West Highway to the north, the Sligo Creek River to the south, and Riggs Road to the west. Green Meadows borders the communities of Hyattsville, Chillum, and Lewisdale. The primary roads that pass through Green Meadows are East West Highway, Ager Road and Riggs Road.

== History ==
The developer-built Green Meadows was platted in the early 1940s and completed by 1942. The street pattern of Green Meadows is a fragmented grid of curved parallel streets. The houses are primarily two-family attached units constructed of brick or brick and frame. The Green Meadows subdivision was extended on its south end by two streets in 1957. The neighborhood is about a mile from the West Hyattsville and Hyattsville Crossing stations on the Washington Metro Green Line.

== Education ==
Rosa L. Parks Elementary School (grades pre-k to 6), Prince George's County Public School System

== Parks and recreation ==
1. Green Meadows Community Park

2. Heurich Community Park

== Trails ==
1. Northwest Branch Trail

2. Sligo Creek Trail
