= St. Ann's Center for Children, Youth and Families =

Coordinates: 38°57′4″N 76°58′55.6″W

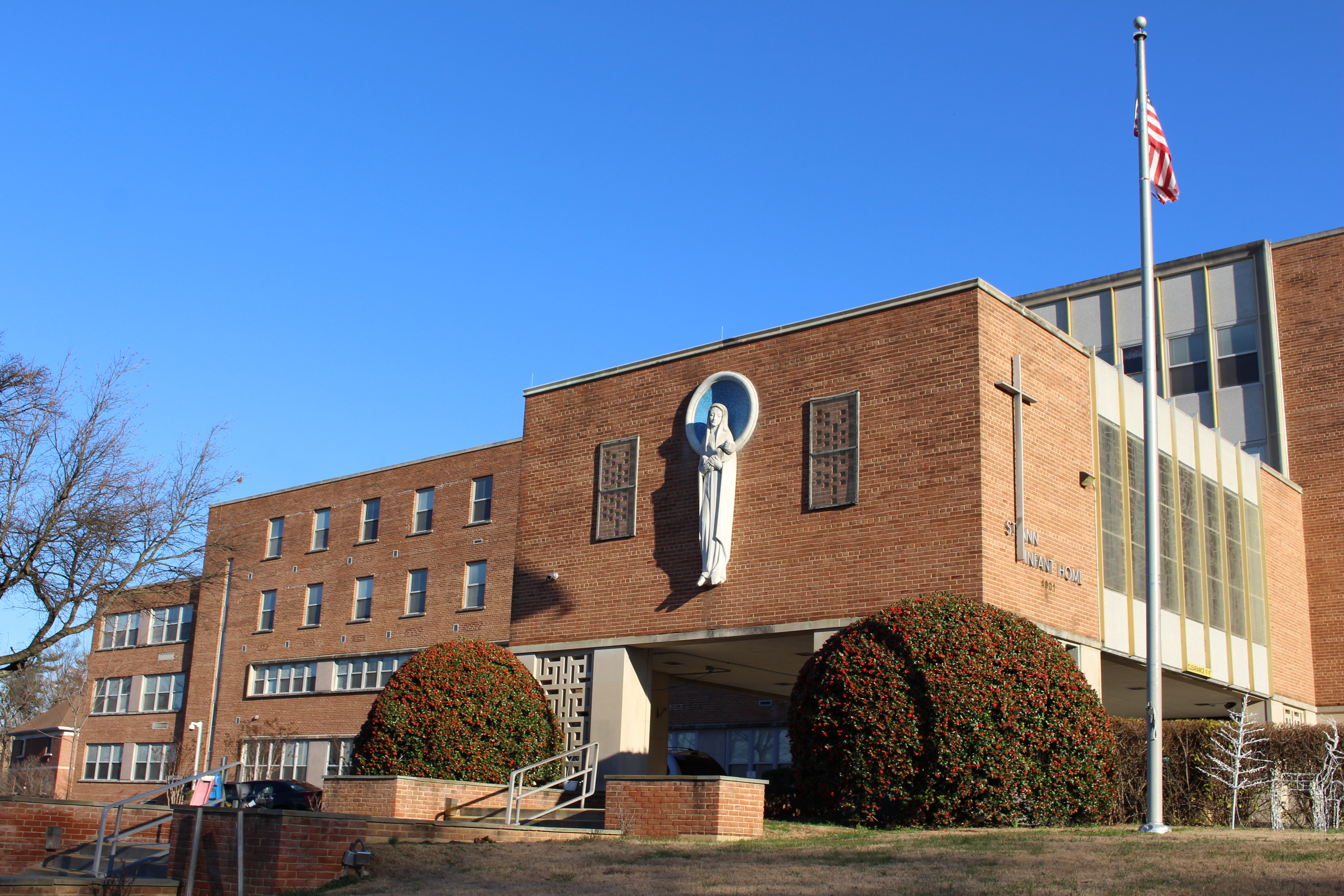
The main building of St. Ann's Center for Children, Youth & Families in Hyattsville, Maryland

St. Ann's Center for Children, Youth and Families, formerly known as St. Ann's Infant and Maternity Home, is administered by the Daughters of Charity of Saint Vincent de Paul within the Roman Catholic Archdiocese of Washington. It is located at 4901 Eastern Avenue in Avondale, Maryland. It provides housing and support to pregnant and parenting young women and their children, as well as quality day care to the children of working families.

== History ==
Prior to 1860 and the beginning of the Civil War, three Daughters of Charity came from Emmitsburg, Maryland, to Washington, D.C., where they established the city's first foundling home. In 1861, St. Ann's initiated its first education and job-training program to prepare single mothers to become family breadwinners.

On March 3, 1863, President Abraham Lincoln signed an Act of Congress to incorporate St. Ann's Infant Asylum, as it was then called. St. Ann's was chartered "for the purpose of establishing and maintaining in the city of Washington, in the District of Columbia, an institution for the maintenance and support of foundlings and infant orphan and half orphan children, and also to provide for deserving, indigent, and unprotected females during their confinement and childbirth." The asylum was charged with caring for the city's growing number of abandoned children and unwed mothers of all races and religions, many of whom had no place else to turn. For 83 years St. Ann's occupied the old British Embassy at 24th Street and K Street, Northwest.

In 1949, St. Ann's started providing affordable day care for working mothers with young children to further assist the Washington community. To meet the growing need for space and services, in 1962 St. Ann's moved from the city to a larger facility in Avondale, Maryland.

In 1996, it was expanded to include a transitional apartment facility to help impoverished, young single mothers, and their children, make the transition to independent living.

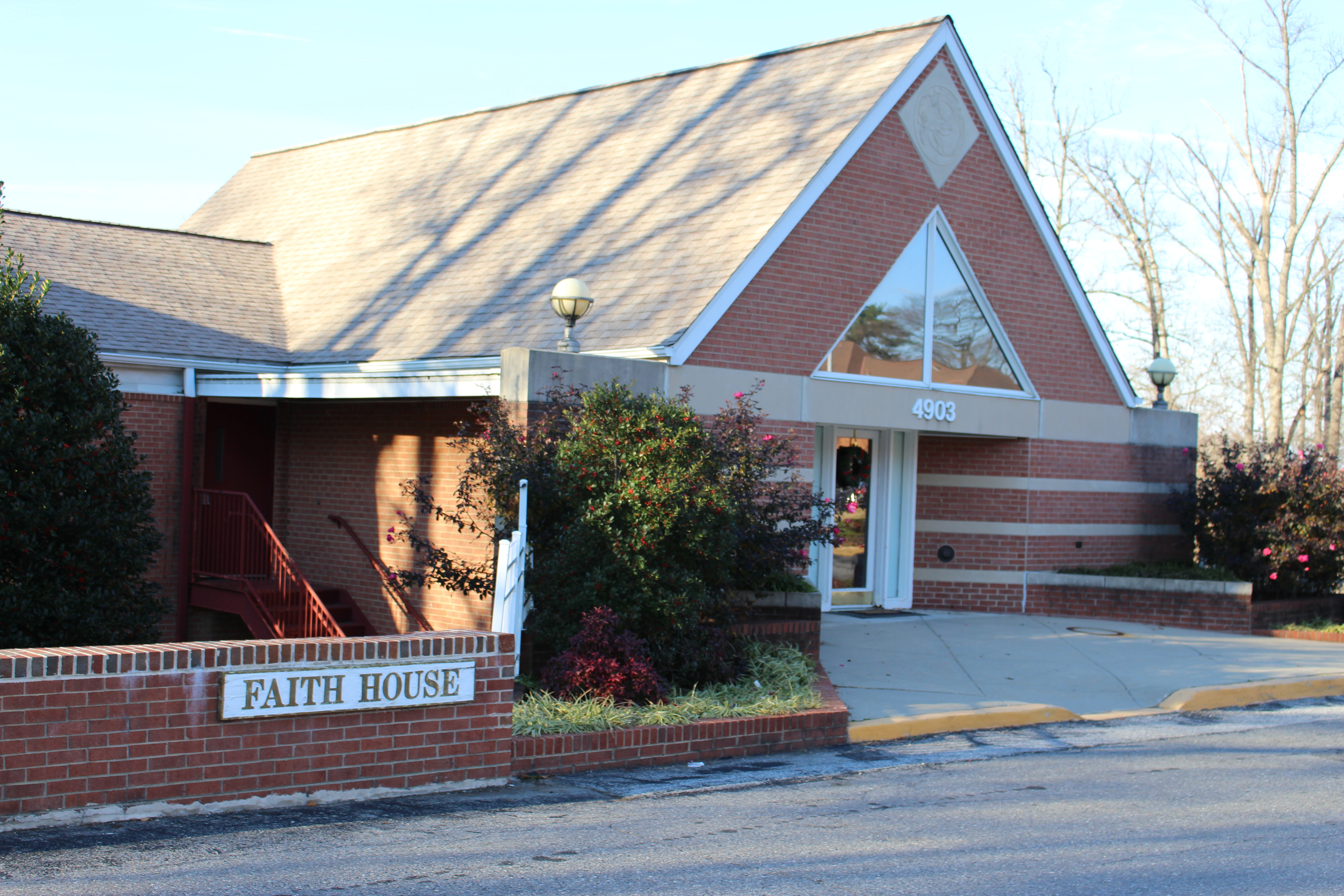
Faith House, home of St. Ann's Center for Children, Youth & Families' Transitional Housing Program for homeless families.

=== Name Change ===
St. Ann's has been known by several names since its founding. Throughout most of its history, the organization was known as St. Ann's Infant and Maternity Home. In 2012, the name was officially changed to St. Ann's Center for Children, Youth and Families to better reflect the full range of clients served and programs offered.

== Programs ==
St. Ann's currently operates transitional housing programs for at-risk mothers and their children as well as a community day care center. As a residential facility, St. Ann's operates 24 hours a day, 7 days a week, 365 days a year.

=== Teen Mother-Baby Program ===
The program offers residential care for pregnant adolescents and young mothers up to age 22 and their babies. Extensive services include an accredited high school, medical care, parenting classes, life skills training, day care, individual and family counseling, and social and cultural activities.

=== Supportive and Transitional Housing Program ===
In 1996, St. Ann's opened Faith House to address the critical housing need for young, homeless mothers in our community. In 2013, the organization expanded its transitional living program with the opening of Hope House, a new housing unit for homeless single mothers and their children. In the Faith House and Hope House programs, vulnerable young families receive resources and support to help them transition to financial independence and self-sufficiency in two years.

=== Child Care Center ===
St. Ann's Child Care Center provides affordable, developmental day care for infants and preschool children in the community and in residence, including children with special needs, and children from low-income, single parent families and from families in crisis.
