= Maryland Route 410 =

State highway in the Maryland, U.S.

Maryland Route 410
- Maryland Route 410 highlighted in red

Route information
- Maintained by MDSHA
- Length: 13.92 mi (22.40 km)
- Existed: 1930–present

Major junctions
- West end: MD 355 / MD 187 in Bethesda
- MD 185 in Chevy Chase; US 29 in Silver Spring; MD 650 in Takoma Park; MD 212 in Chillum; MD 500 in Hyattsville; US 1 in Riverdale Park; MD 201 in East Riverdale; MD 295 in East Riverdale; MD 450 in New Carrollton; US 50 in Landover Hills
- East end: Pennsy Drive in Landover Hills

Location
- Country: United States
- State: Maryland
- Counties: Montgomery, Prince George's

Highway system
- Maryland highway system; Interstate; US; State; Scenic Byways
← MD 408	→ MD 413

Maryland Route 410 (MD 410) is a state highway in the U.S. state of Maryland and known for most of its length as East–West Highway. The highway runs east to west (hence its name) for 13.92 miles (22.40 km) from MD 355 in Bethesda east to Pennsy Drive in Landover Hills. MD 410 serves as a major east–west commuter route through the inner northern suburbs of Washington, D.C., connecting the commercial districts of Bethesda, Silver Spring, and Hyattsville. In addition, the highway serves the industrial area of Landover Hills and the residential suburbs of Chevy Chase, Takoma Park, Chillum, Riverdale, and East Riverdale. The road also connects many of the arterial highways and freeways that head out of Washington. Additionally, it provides a highway connection to transit and commercial hubs centered around Washington Metro subway stations in Bethesda, Takoma Park, Hyattsville, Silver Spring, and New Carrollton–the latter two of which provide additional connections to MARC and Amtrak trains.

MD 410 was originally built along a mostly new alignment between Bethesda and Silver Spring in the late 1920s. The Montgomery County portion has not changed much in the ensuing decades. In the mid-1930s, the highway was extended east to Hyattsville in Prince George's County, where it has been realigned and extended multiple times. These changes included: an extension along existing roads further into Hyattsville in the mid-1940s; a realignment within Hyattsville in the mid-1950s; an extension through Riverdale in the late 1960s; and the final extension to New Carrollton and Landover Hills in the early 1990s.

== Route description ==
MD 410 is maintained by the Maryland State Highway Administration (MDSHA) except for three municipally maintained segments in the city of Takoma Park and a short stretch maintained by Prince George's County in East Riverdale.

The segments maintained by the city of Takoma Park run from Chestnut Avenue to near Cedar Avenue for 0.17 miles (0.27 km); from Maple Avenue to MD 195 for 0.27 miles (0.43 km); and from the second junction with MD 195 to Elm Avenue, the longest non-state maintained portion with a length of 0.53 miles (0.85 km).

In Prince George's County, in East Riverdale, MD 410 is county maintained for 0.35 miles (0.56 km), from the Baltimore-Washington Parkway to its turn from Riverdale Road onto Veterans Parkway. Here, in its final 2.6 miles, MD 410 becomes a part of the National Highway System, serving as a principal arterial for US 50. Past Route 50, MD 410 reaches its eastern terminus at Pennsy Drive.

=== Montgomery County ===
MD 410 begins at MD 355 (Wisconsin Avenue) as a one-way pair—East–West Highway westbound and Montgomery Avenue eastbound—on either side of Bethesda station on the Washington Metro's Red Line in downtown Bethesda. Westbound MD 410 ends at the intersection of MD 355 and the southern terminus of MD 187, which begins one-way northbound along Old Georgetown Road. Eastbound MD 410 begins where Montgomery Lane meets MD 355, receiving traffic from the southbound direction of MD 187 via Woodmont Avenue.

MD 410's two directions converge at the eastern edge of downtown Bethesda, east of Bethesda-Chevy Chase High School. From that intersection, traffic can use a U-turn lane from Montgomery Avenue to enter westbound East–West Highway back towards MD 355 or use a merge lane to enter MD 410 heading east. From there, East–West Highway continues east as a four-lane, undivided highway.

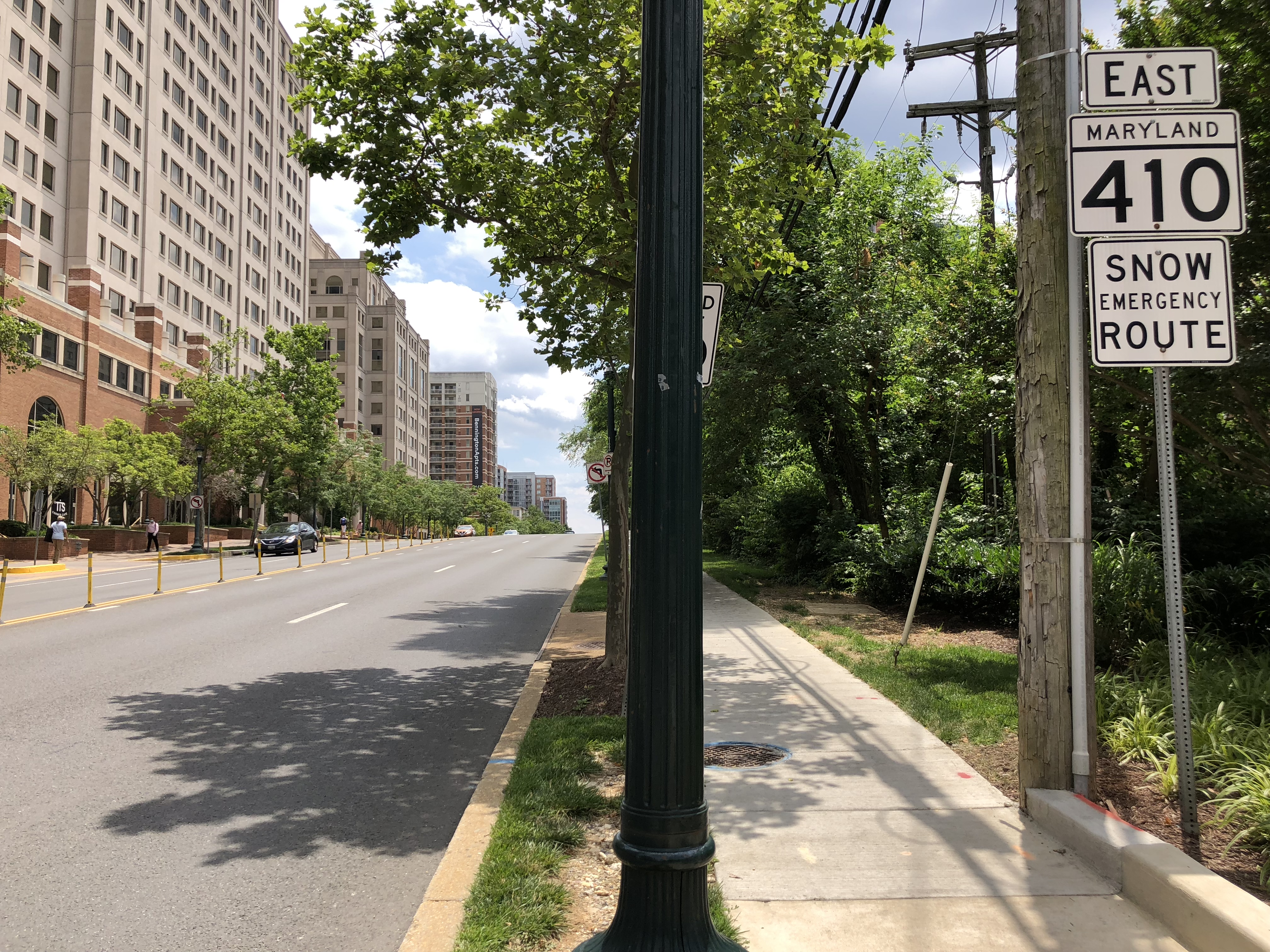
View east along MD 410 east of MD 384 near the National Oceanic and Atmospheric Administration headquarters in downtown Silver Spring

MD 410 crosses a bridge over the Capital Crescent Trail and the under-construction Purple Line. It then follows the northern edge of the town of Chevy Chase, crosses Coquelin Run, and runs along the southern edge of the Columbia Country Club to its intersection with MD 185 (Connecticut Avenue).

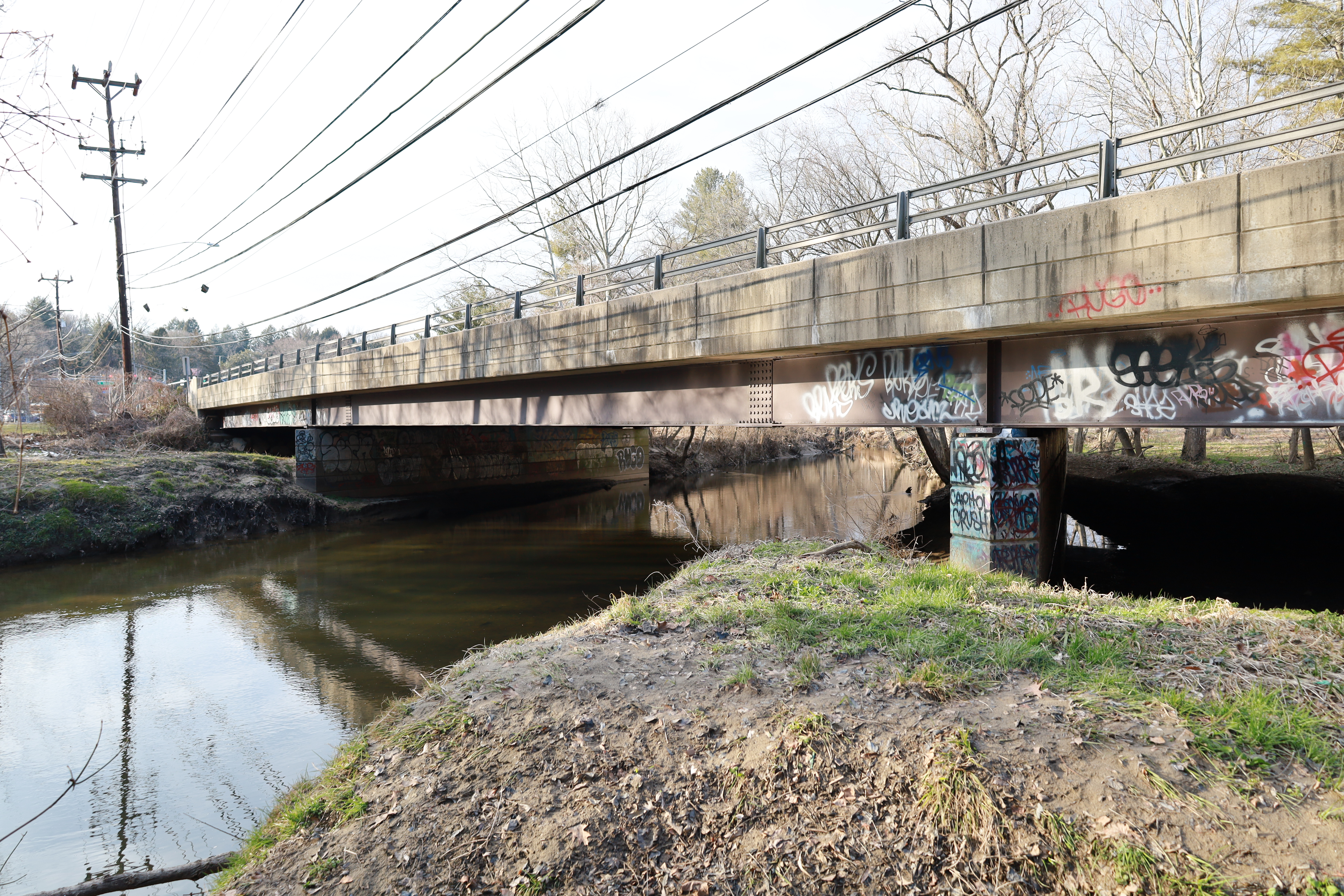
MD 410 (East-West Highway) crossing Rock Creek

Leaving the town of Chevy Chase, MD 410 passes through an unincorporated area of Chevy Chase, within which the highway meets the northern end of MD 186 (Brookville Road). It descends into the valley of Rock Creek, where it intersects with Jones Mill Road and Beach Drive, the main road through Rock Creek Park. MD 410 then crosses over Rock Creek, passes to the north of Meadowbrook Park, and leaves the valley as a four-lane divided highway with a narrow median and flanking service roads.

MD 410 reaches the top of a hill at Grubb Road and descends into the valley of a branch of Rock Creek. The highway becomes undivided at Sundale Drive and crosses the branch stream just west of the northern corner of the District of Columbia and its attendant boundary marker. It then leaves the stream valley and ascends to an intersection with MD 390 (16th Street) at the western edge of downtown Silver Spring.

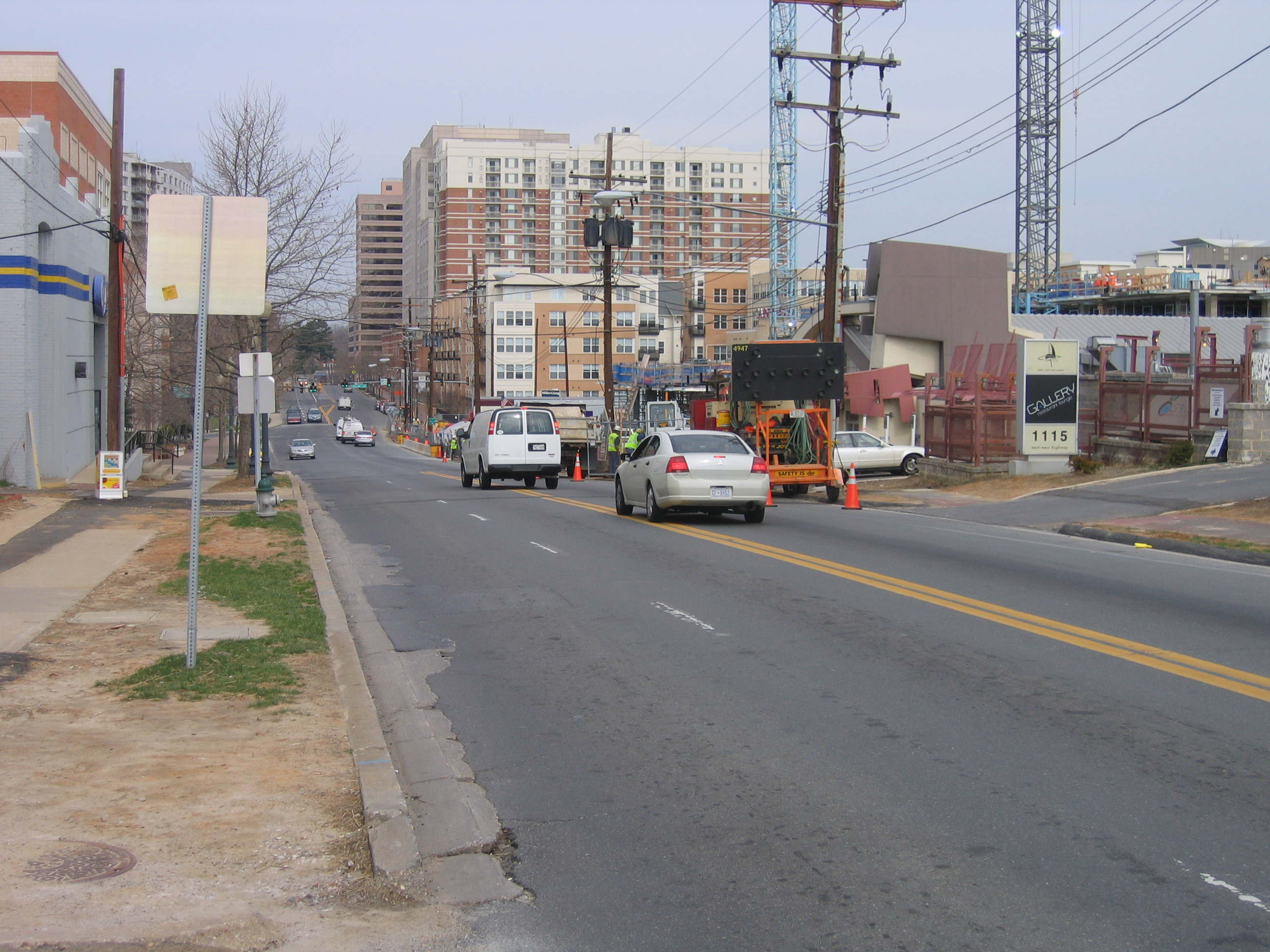
Looking west down MD 410 (East–West Highway) in south Silver Spring

MD 410 intersects MD 384 (Colesville Road) next to the headquarters of the National Oceanic and Atmospheric Administration and just south of the Metro's Silver Spring station, which serves the Washington Metro's Red Line and the MARC Brunswick Line. The highway parallels CSX's Metropolitan Subdivision railroad line and the Red Line southeast to a five-way intersection with US 29 (Georgia Avenue) and 13th Street.

Here MD 410 crosses Georgia Avenue to Burlington Avenue. (No direct access exists from eastbound MD 410 to northbound Georgia Avenue (US 29) or from southbound Georgia Avenue US to eastbound MD 410.) MD 410 continues east on three-lane Burlington Avenue (two lanes westbound and one lane eastbound) and crosses over the rail and Metro lines. At Fenton Street, the highway veers southeast onto two-lane Philadelphia Avenue, where it enters the city of Takoma Park as it passes by the Takoma Park/Silver Spring Campus of Montgomery College.

MD 410 intersects MD 320 (Piney Branch Road) and then a four-way stop at Holly Avenue next to Takoma Park Elementary School. The highway continues through an intersection with Maple Avenue, next to the Takoma Park Library; then follows Philadelphia Avenue to its end at MD 195 (Carroll Avenue) at Takoma Junction; runs concurrently with MD 195 for one block; continues east along Ethan Allen Avenue, which it follows–through a three-way stop at Jackson Avenue–to the eastern city limit of Takoma Park and the Montgomery-Prince George's county line at MD 650 (New Hampshire Avenue).

=== Prince George's County ===
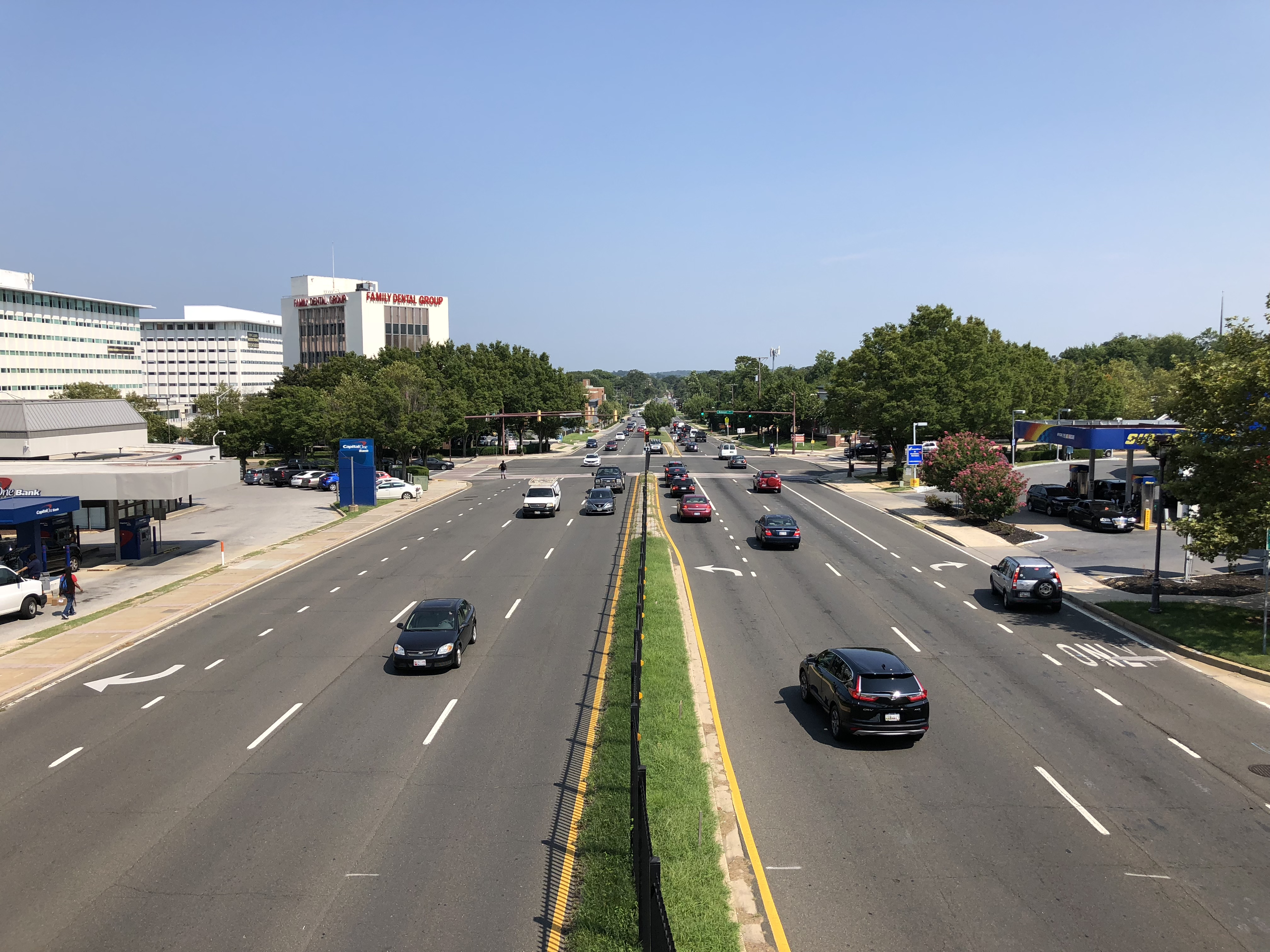
MD 410 eastbound at Prince George's Plaza in Hyattsville

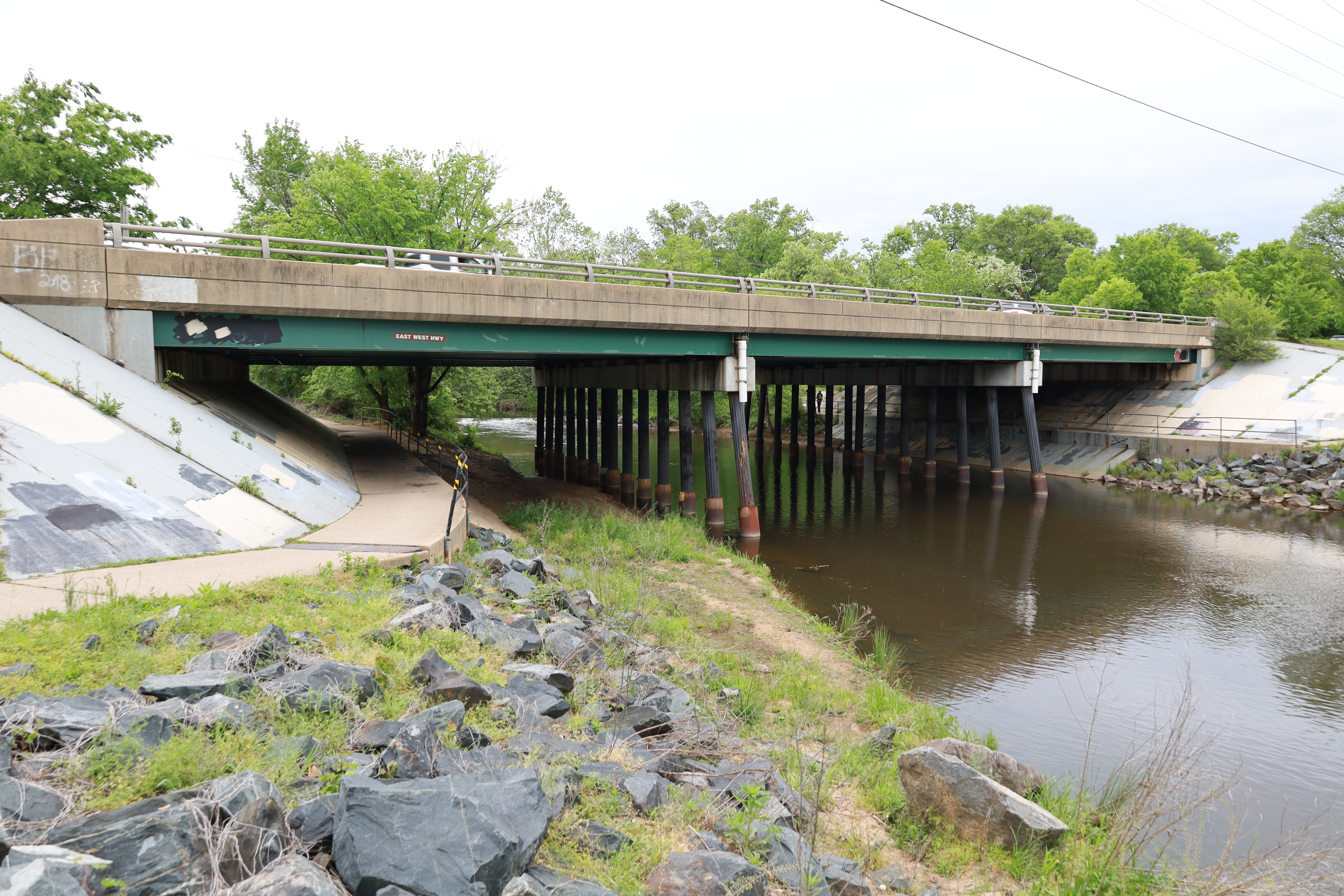
MD 410 crossing the Northeast Branch Anacostia River

MD 410's name becomes East–West Highway again as it heads east from MD 650 as a four-lane undivided highway through the northern part of Chillum. The highway has frontage roads on either side of its crossing of Sligo Creek, then becomes divided ahead of its intersection with MD 212 (Riggs Road).

As it heads southeast briefly on Ager Road, MD 410 briefly has six lanes. Ager Road eventually passes the West Hyattsville station on the Washington Metro's Green Line. MD 410 has a partial intersection with Ager Road; the missing movements between MD 410 and Ager Road are made via 23rd Avenue to the east.

MD 410 then branches into its own road again, where it becomes a four lane divided highway. It crosses the Northwest Branch Anacostia River and enters Hyattsville. The highway expands to six lanes as it passes between The Mall at Prince George's and Metro's Hyattsville Crossing station. Beyond University Town Center and the headquarters of the National Center for Health Statistics, MD 410 approaches a four-way intersection with the northern end of MD 500 (Queens Chapel Road) and the southern end of Adelphi Road.

The six-lane divided highway continues east, between Hyattsville to the south and University Park to the north. Eventually the south side of the highway is flanked by the town of Riverdale Park. As MD 410 crosses US 1 (Baltimore Avenue), it fully enters Riverdale Park, where it reduces to four lanes. It crosses over CSX's Capital Subdivision railroad line, which also carries the MARC Camden Line. (The Camden Line can be boarded at the Riverdale station within the Riverdale Park Historic District to the south, which also contains the Riversdale Mansion.) A tributary of the Northeast Branch Anacostia River briefly runs within the median of the highway shortly before it crosses over the Northeast Branch. Then MD 410 intersects and crosses MD 201 (Kenilworth Avenue) leaving the town of Riverdale Park.

The highway continues as Riverdale Road, a four-lane road with a center turn lane, through the unincorporated area of East Riverdale on its way to a diamond interchange with the Baltimore–Washington Parkway (unsigned MD 295).

MD 410 then continues east on Riverdale Road and turns southeast onto Veterans Parkway, a four-lane divided highway (while Riverdale Road continues toward New Carrollton). The divided highway briefly enters the city of New Carrollton around its intersection with MD 450 (Annapolis Road). MD 410 continues south and intersects Ellin Road (unsigned MD 433) before passing through a diamond interchange with US 50 (John Hanson Highway).

The highway crosses over US 50; Amtrak's Northeast Corridor railroad line, also used by MARC's Penn Line; and Washington Metro's Orange Line. South of the railroad tracks, MD 410 quickly reaches its eastern terminus at Pennsy Drive. The nearby New Carrollton station serves as the eastern terminus of the Orange Line subway and hosts MARC and Amtrak service and commuter and intercity bus service. Nearby Ardwick Ardmore Road provides access to the primary entrance to the Metro New Carrollton station. Secondary access to the station is provided by Ellin Road north of US 50.

== History ==
The Bethesda-Silver Spring Highway was conceived in the late 1920s as a means of directly connecting the two Montgomery County inner suburbs on the north side of Washington. The highway was under construction between 1927 and 1929. The first portion opened on December 7, 1929, between then-US 240 in Bethesda and Sixteenth Street, which itself had been extended north from the District of Columbia line. It was signed as MD 410 by 1930. An automatic traffic light was installed at its intersection with Connecticut Avenue in November 1931.

Most of MD 410 was built on a new alignment with the exception of the part between present day MD 186 and Jones Mill Road, which followed the old Brookville Road.

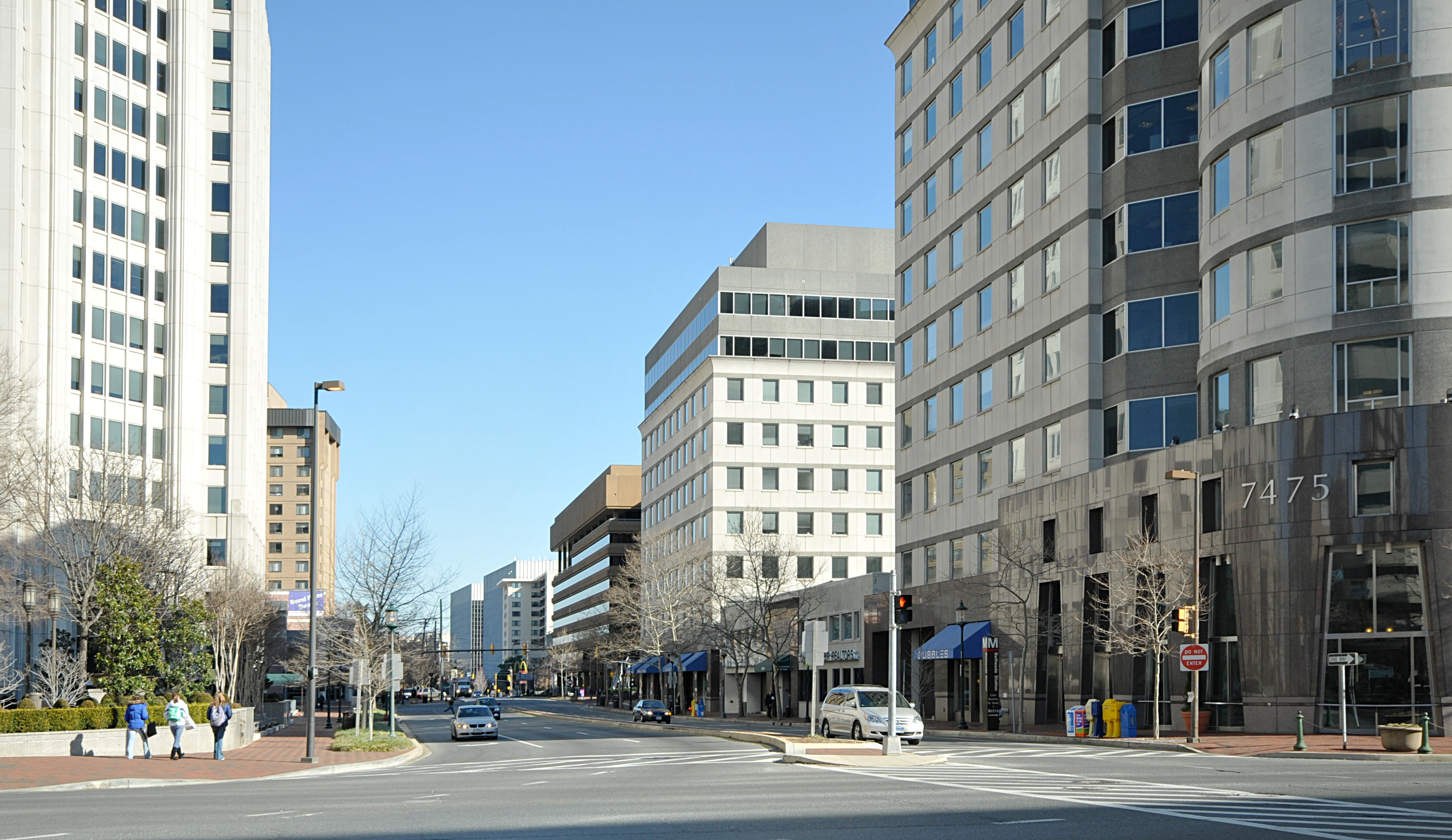
MD 410 (East–West Highway) at its western terminus in Bethesda

By 1933, the new state highway was the busiest road in Montgomery County. The road, which became known as East-West Highway, was originally built with a width of 20 feet, but the heavy traffic led the Maryland State Roads Commission (SRC), the predecessor of MDSHA, to suggest in 1934 that the road be widened to 40 feet in the near future. The SRC also recommended extending East-West Highway through Silver Spring and Takoma Park to Hyattsville.

By 1935, the highway was extended along a new alignment east from 16th Street to Takoma Park, then placed on Philadelphia Avenue and Ethan Allen Avenue within Takoma Park. The extension to MD 212 in Hyattsville was completed in 1936.

Maryland Route 209
- Location: Chillum–Hyattsville
- Existed: 1927–c. 1946

After World War II, MD 410 was extended even further east and saw significant improvement on its extant sections. By 1946, MD 410 was extended over Hyattsville's Ager Road, Hamilton Street, 38th Avenue, and Jefferson Avenue–roads then designated MD 209–to a new eastern terminus at US 1 in Hyattsville.

In addition, the pre-1946 course saw completion of efforts to widen the road to 40 feet. The highway between Connecticut Avenue (then MD 193) and Georgia Avenue (US 29) was widened in 1946 and 1947. In 1950, two segments were widened: Wisconsin Avenue (US 240) to Connecticut Avenue (MD 193), and MD 650 (New Hampshire Avenue) in Takoma Park to US 1 in Hyattsville.

Maryland Route 403
- Location: Hyattsville–Riverdale
- Existed: 1942–1956

Beyond minor improvements, the configuration of MD 410 in Montgomery County has remained much same since 1950. The only major change was the highway being split onto a one-way pair of streets in Bethesda in 1988.

The Prince George's County section has seen more substantial changes over the intervening decades. The first major change in alignment occurred in 1956, when MD 410 was completed on a new alignment as a four-lane divided highway between Ager Road (just east of MD 212) and MD 500.

MD 410 was subsequently extended east over the former MD 403 (Colesville Road), which ran between MD 500 and US 1 in Riverdale. By 1970, this segment was upgraded to a multi-lane divided highway.

Then, between 1967 and 1970, MD 410 was extended as a four-lane divided highway on a new alignment east from US 1, past MD 201, to the Baltimore-Washington Parkway interchange at Riverdale Road. This extension bypassed and replaced MD 412 between US 1 and the B-W Parkway.

Finally, MD 410 was completed in 1991 when it extended east on Veterans Parkway past US 50 to its current terminus at Pennsy Drive.

The sections of MD 410 in Takoma Park from Chestnut Avenue to Cedar Avenue and from Maple Avenue to Elm Avenue were transferred from municipal to state maintenance in an agreement dated February 16, 2013. The portion of MD 410 between MD 295 and Veterans Parkway in Prince George's County was transferred from county to state maintenance in an agreement dated May 11, 2017.

== Junction list ==
County	Location	mi	km	Destinations	Notes
Montgomery	Bethesda	0.00	0.00	MD 355 (Wisconsin Avenue) / MD 187 north (Old Georgetown Road) – Rockville, Washington	Western terminus; southern terminus of MD 187
Montgomery	Chevy Chase	1.01	1.63	MD 185 (Connecticut Avenue) – Kensington, Washington	
Montgomery	Chevy Chase	1.38	2.22	MD 186 south (Brookville Road) – Chevy Chase Village	Northern terminus of MD 186
Montgomery	Chevy Chase	1.89	3.04	Beach Drive south / Jones Mill Road north – Rock Creek Park	
Montgomery	Silver Spring	3.48	5.60	MD 390 (16th Street) to MD 97 – Wheaton, Washington	
Montgomery	Silver Spring	3.71	5.97	MD 384 (Colesville Road) to US 29 north – Columbia, Washington	
Montgomery	Silver Spring	4.24	6.82	US 29 (Georgia Avenue) – Washington	No direct access from eastbound MD 410 to northbound US 29 or from southbound US 29 to eastbound MD 410
Montgomery	Takoma Park	4.96	7.98	MD 320 (Piney Branch Road) – Silver Spring, Washington	
Montgomery	Takoma Park	5.56	8.95	MD 195 south (Carroll Avenue) – Washington	West end of concurrency with MD 195
Montgomery	Takoma Park	5.63	9.06	MD 195 north (Carroll Avenue) – Langley Park	East end of concurrency with MD 195
Montgomery	Takoma Park	6.31	10.15	MD 650 (New Hampshire Avenue) – Langley Park, Washington	
Prince George's	Chillum	7.17	11.54	MD 212 (Riggs Road) – Langley Park, Washington	
Prince George's	Hyattsville	8.96	14.42	MD 500 south (Queens Chapel Road) / Adelphi Road north – Mount Rainier, Adelphi	Northern terminus of MD 500
Prince George's	Riverdale Park	9.48	15.26	US 1 (Baltimore Avenue) – Hyattsville, College Park	
Prince George's	Riverdale Park	10.56	16.99	MD 201 (Kenilworth Avenue) – Bladensburg, Greenbelt	
Prince George's	East Riverdale	11.33	18.23	Baltimore–Washington Parkway (MD 295) – Baltimore, BWI Marshall Airport, Washington	Diamond interchange
Prince George's	New Carrollton	12.83	20.65	MD 450 (Annapolis Road) – New Carrollton, Bladensburg	
Prince George's	New Carrollton	13.19	21.23	Ellin Road (MD 433 north)	Southern terminus of unsigned MD 433
Prince George's	Landover Hills	13.46	21.66	US 50 (John Hanson Highway) – Annapolis, Washington	US 50 exit 5
Prince George's	Landover Hills	13.92	22.40	Pennsy Drive to Ardwick Ardmore Road	Eastern terminus
1.000 mi = 1.609 km; 1.000 km = 0.621 mi: Concurrency terminus; Incomplete access

== Auxiliary route ==
MD 410 has one former auxiliary route. MD 410A was the designation for the 0.25-mile (0.40 km) portion of Belcrest Road between MD 500 and MD 410 in Hyattsville. The route was assigned by 1999. MD 410A was transferred to county maintenance in 2004.
