= Mount Rainier, Maryland =

City in Maryland, United States

- City
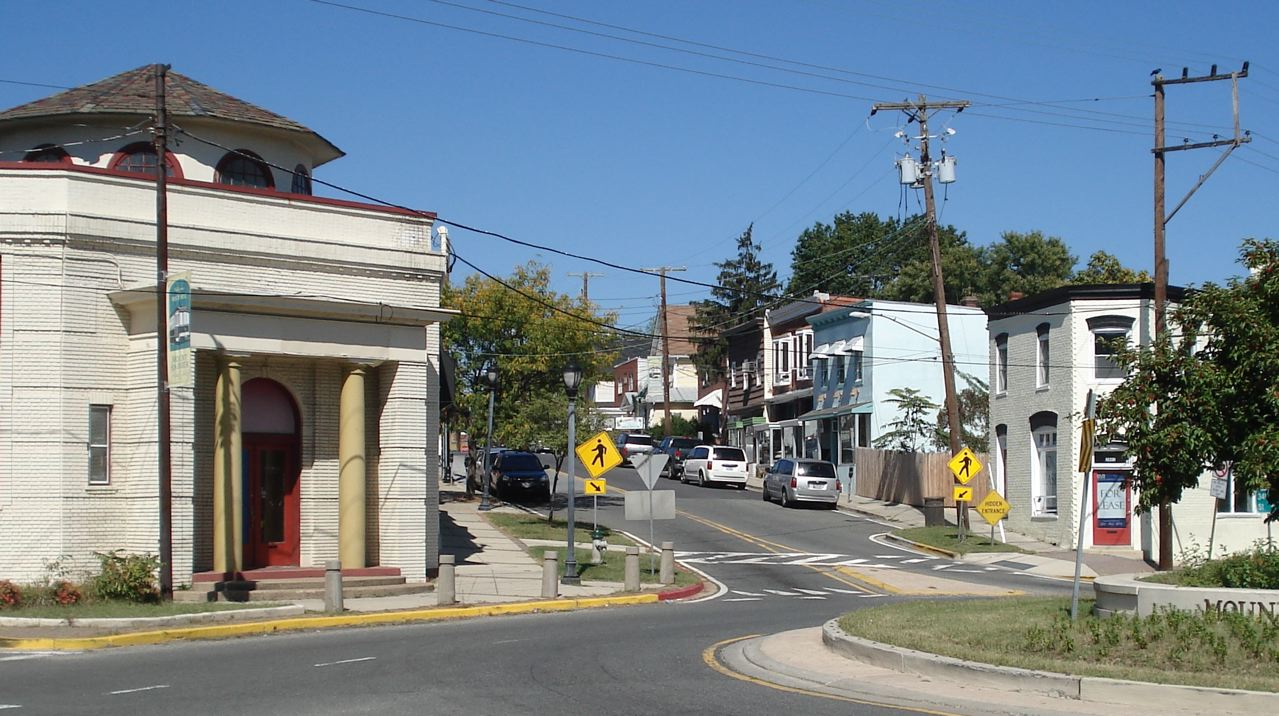

- Flag Seal

- Location of Mount Rainier, Maryland
- Coordinates: 38°56′30″N 76°57′49″W
- Country: United States of America
- State: Maryland
- County: Prince George's
- Incorporated: 1910

Government
  - Mayor: Celina Benitez

Area
  - Total: 0.64 sq mi (1.65 km^{2})
  - Land: 0.64 sq mi (1.65 km^{2})
  - Water: 0 sq mi (0.00 km^{2})
- Elevation: 79 ft (24 m)

Population (2020)
  - Total: 8,333
  - Density: 13,095.6/sq mi (5,056.25/km^{2})
- Time zone: UTC-5 (EST)
  - Summer (DST): UTC-4 (EDT)
- ZIP code: 20712
- Area codes: 301, 240
- FIPS code: 24-54275
- GNIS feature ID: 0597787
- Website: http://www.mountrainiermd.org

Mount Rainier (/reɪˈnɪər/) is a city in Prince George's County, Maryland, United States, bordering Washington, D.C. The population was 8,333 at the 2020 census. Mount Rainier is contained between the Northwest Branch Anacostia River, Cedar Lane Alley, and 34th Street to the north, 37th Street and 37th Place to the northeast, Upshur Street and Queens Chapel Road to the west, the CSX Capital Subdivision train tracks to the east, and Eastern Avenue NE to the south. Mount Rainier got its start as a streetcar suburb, when tracks were laid for the 82 Streetcar Line. According to local tradition, surveyors from the Pacific Northwest named the town, giving the streets names such as Shasta and Cascade. Historic U.S. 1 runs through the center of the town and serves as the main street and central business district.

== Adjacent areas ==
- Brentwood (to the north)
- Cottage City (to the east)
- Avondale (to the west)
- Hyattsville (to the northeast)
- Woodridge, Washington D.C. (to the south)

== Geography ==
Mount Rainier is located at 38°56′30″N 76°57′49″W (38.941594, -76.963696).

According to the United States Census Bureau, the city has a total area of 0.65 square miles (1.68 km^{2}), all land.

== Demographics ==
Historical population
Census	Pop.	Note	%±
1910	1,242		—
1920	2,462		98.2%
1930	3,832		55.6%
1940	4,830		26.0%
1950	10,989		127.5%
1960	9,855		−10.3%
1970	8,180		−17.0%
1980	7,361		−10.0%
1990	7,954		8.1%
2000	8,498		6.8%
2010	8,080		−4.9%
2020	8,333		3.1%
U.S. Decennial Census; 2010 2020

=== Racial and ethnic composition ===
Mount Rainier city, Maryland – Racial and ethnic composition Note: the US Census treats Hispanic/Latino as an ethnic category. This table excludes Latinos from the racial categories and assigns them to a separate category. Hispanics/Latinos may be of any race.
Race / Ethnicity (NH = Non-Hispanic)	Pop 2000	Pop 2010	Pop 2020	% 2000	% 2010	% 2020
White alone (NH)	1,319	1,050	1,271	15.52%	13.00%	15.25%
Black or African American alone (NH)	5,159	4,116	3,300	60.71%	50.94%	39.60%
Native American or Alaska Native alone (NH)	17	27	8	0.20%	0.33%	0.10%
Asian alone (NH)	194	187	186	2.28%	2.31%	2.23%
Native Hawaiian or Pacific Islander alone (NH)	2	2	7	0.02%	0.02%	0.08%
Other race alone (NH)	22	34	52	0.26%	0.42%	0.62%
Mixed race or Multiracial (NH)	230	128	308	2.71%	1.58%	3.70%
Hispanic or Latino (any race)	1,555	2,536	3,201	18.30%	31.39%	38.41%
Total	8,498	8,080	8,333	100.00%	100.00%	100.00%

=== 2020 census ===
As of the 2020 census, there were 8,333 people in Mount Rainier. The median age was 34.8 years, with 22.0% of residents under age 18 and 11.0% age 65 or older. For every 100 females, there were 94.5 males, and for every 100 females age 18 and over, there were 93.3 males age 18 and over.

In 2020, 100.0% of residents lived in urban areas and 0.0% lived in rural areas.

There were 3,475 households, of which 30.5% had children under the age of 18 living in them. Of all households, 29.4% were married-couple households, 26.4% were households with a male householder and no spouse or partner present, and 36.0% were households with a female householder and no spouse or partner present. About 38.2% of all households were made up of individuals, and 9.7% had someone living alone who was 65 years of age or older.

There were 3,655 housing units, of which 4.9% were vacant. The homeowner vacancy rate was 1.6% and the rental vacancy rate was 3.8%.

=== 2010 census ===
As of the census of 2010, there were 8,080 people, 3,344 households, and 1,735 families residing in the city. The population density was 12,430.8 inhabitants per square mile (4,799.6/km^{2}). There were 3,601 housing units at an average density of 5,540.0 per square mile (2,139.0/km^{2}). The racial makeup of the city was 19.9% White, 52.8% African American, 0.6% Native American, 2.3% Asian, 20.9% from other races, and 3.6% from two or more races. Hispanic or Latino of any race were 31.4% of the population.

There were 3,344 households, of which 30.8% had children under the age of 18 living with them, 25.9% were married couples living together, 18.3% had a female householder with no husband present, 7.7% had a male householder with no wife present, and 48.1% were non-families. 39.4% of all households were made up of individuals, and 5% had someone living alone who was 65 years of age or older. The average household size was 2.41 and the average family size was 3.27.

The median age in the city was 32.7 years. 22.9% of residents were under the age of 18; 10.7% were between the ages of 18 and 24; 35.5% were from 25 to 44; 24.5% were from 45 to 64; and 6.5% were 65 years of age or older. The gender makeup of the city was 49.4% male and 50.6% female.

=== 2000 census ===
As of the census of 2000, there were 8,498 people, 3,487 households, and 1,858 families residing in the city. The population density was 13,038.5 inhabitants per square mile (5,034.2/km^{2}). There were 3,756 housing units at an average density of 5,762.8 per square mile (2,225.0/km^{2}). The racial makeup of the city was 20.20% White, 62.06% African American, 0.33% Native American, 2.31% Asian, 0.02% Pacific Islander, 10.65% from other races, and 4.42% from two or more races. Hispanic or Latino of any race were 18.30% of the population.

There were 3,487 households, out of which 28.8% had children under the age of 18 living with them, 25.6% were married couples living together, 19.7% had a female householder with no husband present, and 46.7% were non-families. 36.8% of all households were made up of individuals, and 6.6% had someone living alone who was 65 years of age or older. The average household size was 2.43 and the average family size was 3.27.

In the city, the population was spread out, with 24.8% under the age of 18, 11.8% from 18 to 24, 37.2% from 25 to 44, 19.2% from 45 to 64, and 7.0% who were 65 years of age or older. The median age was 32 years. For every 100 females, there were 95.3 males. For every 100 females age 18 and over, there were 92.5 males.

The median income for a household in the city was $35,920, and the median income for a family was $39,060. Males had a median income of $30,500 versus $27,441 for females. The per capita income for the city was $17,558. About 9.3% of families and 13.0% of the population were below the poverty line, including 15.6% of those under age 18 and 13.6% of those age 65 or over.

Mount Rainier has attracted a significant gay and lesbian population. In 2000, same-sex couples accounted for 1.0 percent of households, almost double the national average.

== Government ==
Mount Rainier has a council-manager form of government with a city manager who oversees each of the city's departments and day-to-day operations of the city. Mount Rainier's city council consists of five members, the mayor who runs city-wide, and four council members (two from each of the city's two wards). The mayor and city council members serve four-year terms.

Celina Benitez is the current mayor of Mount Rainier (elected in 2021, reelected 2025). The current Ward 1 council members are Jenny Hoffpauir (elected in 2025) and Danielle Carter (elected in 2023). The current Ward 2 council members are Joseph Jakuta (elected in 2025) and Valerie Woodall (elected in 2022, reelected 2023).

The Mount Rainier Police Department serves Mount Rainier. The Chief of Police is Katherine Perez.

== Education ==
Mount Rainier is a part of the Prince George's County Public Schools system.

Schools that serve Mount Rainier include:

- Elementary schools:
  - Mount Rainier Elementary School
    - Mount Rainier began its English as a second language (ESOL) program circa 2004. By that year the school administration was translating communications for parents into Spanish.
  - Thomas Stone Elementary School
- Hyattsville Middle School (in the city of Hyattsville)
- Northwestern High School (Hyattsville)

In the 1940s, when schools in PG County legally were segregated by race, black high school students attended Lakeland High School in College Park. Fairmont Heights High School, then near Fairmount Heights, replaced it in 1950. In 1964, legal racial segregation of PG County schools ended.

== Transportation ==
=== Roads and highways ===
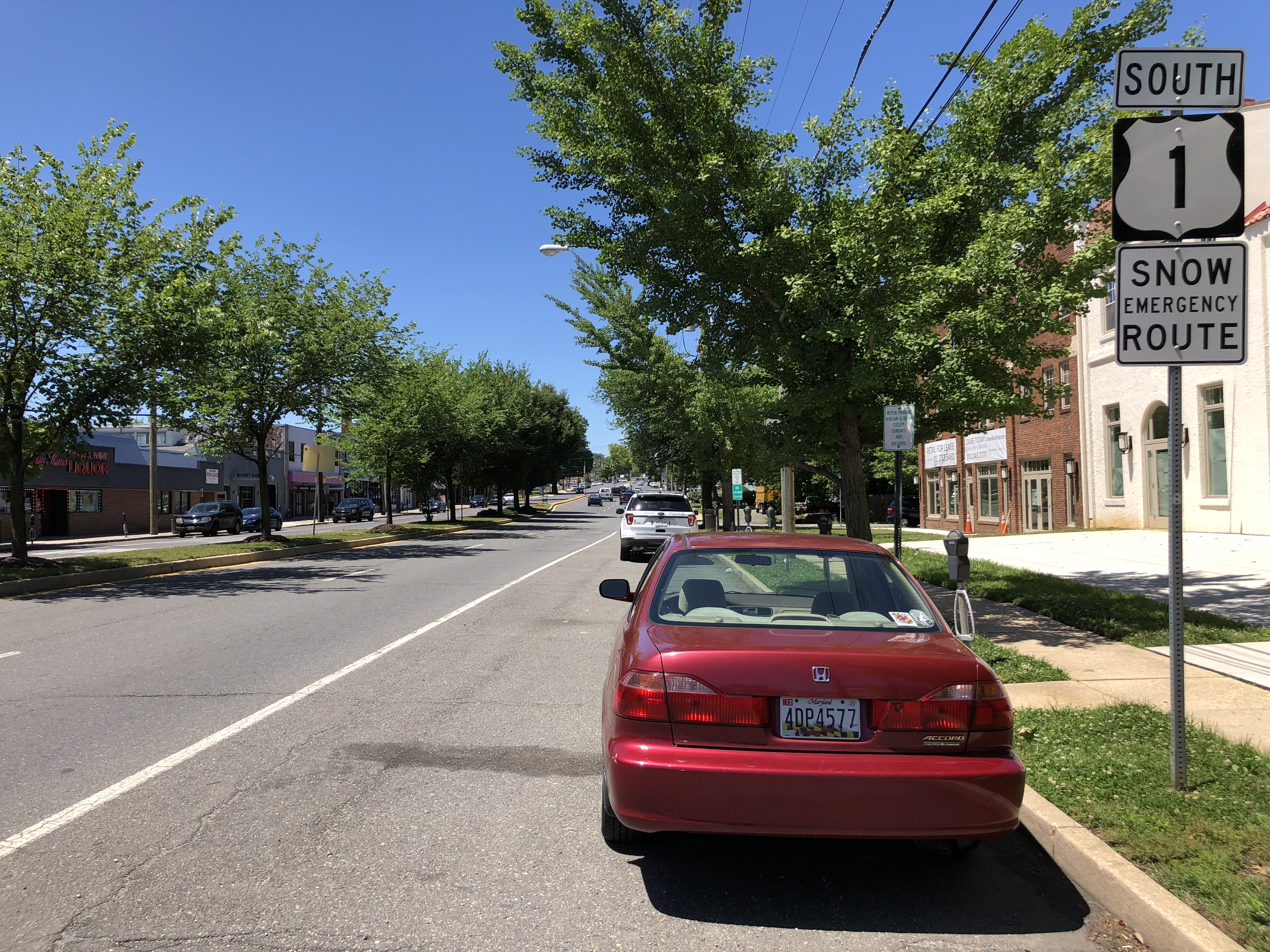
US 1 southbound in Mount Rainier

U.S. 1 is a major north-south roadway running through Mount Rainier, serving as the main street in the downtown area. It leads to College Park and Baltimore to the north and Washington, D.C. to the south. Two other state highways serving Mount Rainier are Maryland Route 500 and Maryland Route 501, both of which skim the northwestern edge of the city.

=== Public transportation ===
Bus service in the city is operated by the WMATA Metrobus through several lines along US 1 and Maryland Route 500 (Queens Chapel Road). Additional bus service is provided by the Prince George's County Department of Public Works & Transportation (DPW&T) The Bus, which also has several lines along the smaller roads. The West Hyattsville station on the Green and Yellow Lines of the Washington Metro also serves Mount Rainier.

== History of Mount Rainier ==
(Drawn from "History of Mount Rainier".)

In 1891, the City of Mount Rainier was named by a group of developers after the famous mountain in the state of Washington.

In 1899, the streetcar lines were extended from Washington D.C. through Hyattsville, Maryland. The Mount Rainier stop was located at the intersection of what is now known as Rhode Island Avenue and 34th Street. It was called the District Line Station. With the stop at Mount Rainier, it was easier to attract developers and prospective buyers because now the city offered easy access to get into and out of Washington.

Houses started to be built near the District Line Station after 1902. The homes in Mount Rainier were considered affordable, ranging from $2,000 to $5,000.

The business district aggregated around the streetcar station. In addition to the station, there were shops, grocery stores, a barbershop, laundry, and dry good stores. The first post office was established in 1904.

In 1910, the residents in the area around the streetcar station petitioned the Maryland State Legislature to incorporate Mount Rainier, and the city was incorporated by a charter granted on April 14, 1910.

In January 1912, the Mount Rainier volunteer fire department was created. The fire department was first located in a frame building and later moved to a brick structure located on 34th at Shepherd Street

In 1913, the Women's Civic League of Mount Rainier formed. In 1923, the first public school of Mount Rainier was constructed, and in the same year, the town hired its first paid police officer because of its growing population.

In 1929, the town acquired 100 acres (0.40 km^{2}) of land, and in the following year, the Mount Rainier High School opened there.

In 1939, a new terminal was built at 34th Street and Rhode Island Avenue because of a change in streetcar services.

In the 1940s, Kaywood Garden apartments were constructed along Eastern Ave., raising the population of Mount Rainier.

In 1952, a library was built. In 1956, a privately operated community pool opened. In 1958, streetcar services stopped and were replaced by bus service.

In the 1970s and 1980s, the population of the city declined.

Today, a large area of Mount Rainier is designated a historic district in the National Register of Historic Places by the National Park Service.

In the present day, Mount Rainier still has many of the charms and attractive features that it had in the early 1900s. Residents of Mount Rainier are served by the Rhode Island Avenue & Brookland-CUA Metro Station and West Hyattsville Metro Station.

== Points of interest ==
Mount Rainier has been listed as a historic area due to its history as a primary streetcar suburb of Washington and the vast number of Sears houses and Craftsman-style homes, many of which have been restored.

There is a lively arts district in the town, which has made a point to provide affordable housing for artists and to showcase their work. Mount Rainier Day, held in May, is one day in which the entire community opens its doors to the public. The town has become a haven for freelance workers in the world of theater, including scenic designers, artistic directors, lighting designers, and stage directors, several of whom have received the highest DC theater honor, the Helen Hayes Award. Mount Rainier is home to the alternative folk music duo Emma's Revolution and Joe Brewer, lead singer of the rock band [velvet] / owner of Brewer's Arcade, which is a museum quality private collection featuring vintage 1980s era classic arcade and pinball machines. The renown Washington Glass School moved their sculptural glass studio to Mount Rainier in 2006.

Glut, a vegetarian, worker-owned organic food cooperative, has existed since the 1960s and draws people from all over the area.

According to some sources, in 1949 at 33rd Street and Bunker Hill Road in Mount Rainier lived a child (see Robbie Mannheim) who allegedly became possessed by the devil. A local priest, Edward Hughes, took part in the exorcism. This incident became the basis for the film The Exorcist. Local citizens have no recollection of this child being a resident of Mount Rainier, and a journalist eventually traced the youth to nearby Cottage City.

== Notable people ==
- Harry Chappas, shortstop for Chicago White Sox in the 1970s, born in Mount Rainier
- Andre Norton, science fiction author, once owned a bookstore in Mount Rainier
- Jimmy Tarlau, former member of the Maryland House of Delegates and the Mount Rainier City Council
