= Brentwood, Maryland =

Town in Prince George's County, Maryland, US

- Town
- Flag Seal

- Location of Brentwood, Maryland
- Coordinates: 38°56′31″N 76°57′20″W
- Country: United States
- State: Maryland
- County: Prince George's
- Incorporated: 1922

Government
  - Mayor: Rocio Treminio-Lopez

Area
  - Total: 0.39 sq mi (1.00 km^{2})
  - Land: 0.39 sq mi (1.00 km^{2})
  - Water: 0 sq mi (0.00 km^{2})
- Elevation: 23 ft (7 m)

Population (2020)
  - Total: 3,828
  - Density: 9,950.2/sq mi (3,841.78/km^{2})
- Time zone: UTC-5 (Eastern (EST))
  - Summer (DST): UTC-4 (EDT)
- ZIP code: 20722
- Area codes: 301, 240
- FIPS code: 24-09500
- GNIS feature ID: 0597122
- Website: Official website

Brentwood is a town in Prince George's County, Maryland, United States. Per the 2020 census, the population was 3,828. Brentwood is located within 1-mile (1.6 km) of Washington, D.C. The municipality of Brentwood is located just outside the northeast boundary of the District of Columbia and surrounded by the communities of Mount Rainier, Cottage City, North Brentwood, and the nearby Hyattsville. Along the Route 1 Corridor, Brentwood is part of the Gateway Arts District.

== History ==
=== 19th century ===
The town was originally incorporated in 1922 and is named after the Brentwood estate built in 1817 by Robert Brent in Northeast Washington, D.C. The town was developed beginning in the 1890s around the Highland Station of the Washington Branch of the Baltimore and Ohio Railroad and the Columbia and Maryland Railway. Brentwood was created by Wallace A. Bartlett, a Civil War veteran, former foreman for the Government Printing Office, Patent Office examiner, and inventor originally from Warsaw, New York. Captain Bartlett lived in Washington, D.C., until 1887, when he purchased 206 acres (0.83 km^{2}) of farmland from Benjamin Holliday, which abutted the Highland subdivision. Bartlett built a farmhouse for his family on the land and, with two partners J. Lee Adams and Samuel J. Mills, formed the Holladay Land and Improvement Company. Captain Bartlett died in 1908.

In 1891, the Company platted a residential subdivision called "Holladay Company's Addition to Highland" on 80 acres (320,000 m^{2}) of the Bartlett Farm. The lots were approximately 40 feet (12 m) by 100 feet (30 m) and were arranged around an irregular grid of streets. The lots in the northern part of the subdivision, which eventually would become North Brentwood, were smaller and were subject to flooding from a mill race. These lots were less expensive, and Bartlett encouraged their purchase by African-American families with whom he was indirectly associated from his command of U.S. Colored Troops in the Civil War. The more expensive lots to the south were purchased by white working-class families, many of whom were employed as federal government clerks. Seven additional houses were built by 1896. In 1899 Bartlett purchased the Fenwick family farm which was located to the west of the Holladay Company's Addition to Highland. With two new partners, J. Baker and Dr. Sigmund A. Czarra, Bartlett began the Brentwood Company. The 95-acre (380,000 m^{2}) area was surveyed and platted in 1899. The Holladay Addition homes represented a typical cross-section of housing styles popular in the late-19th century, including I-houses, vernacular houses with Queen Anne detailing, foursquares, and front gable houses.

=== 20th century ===
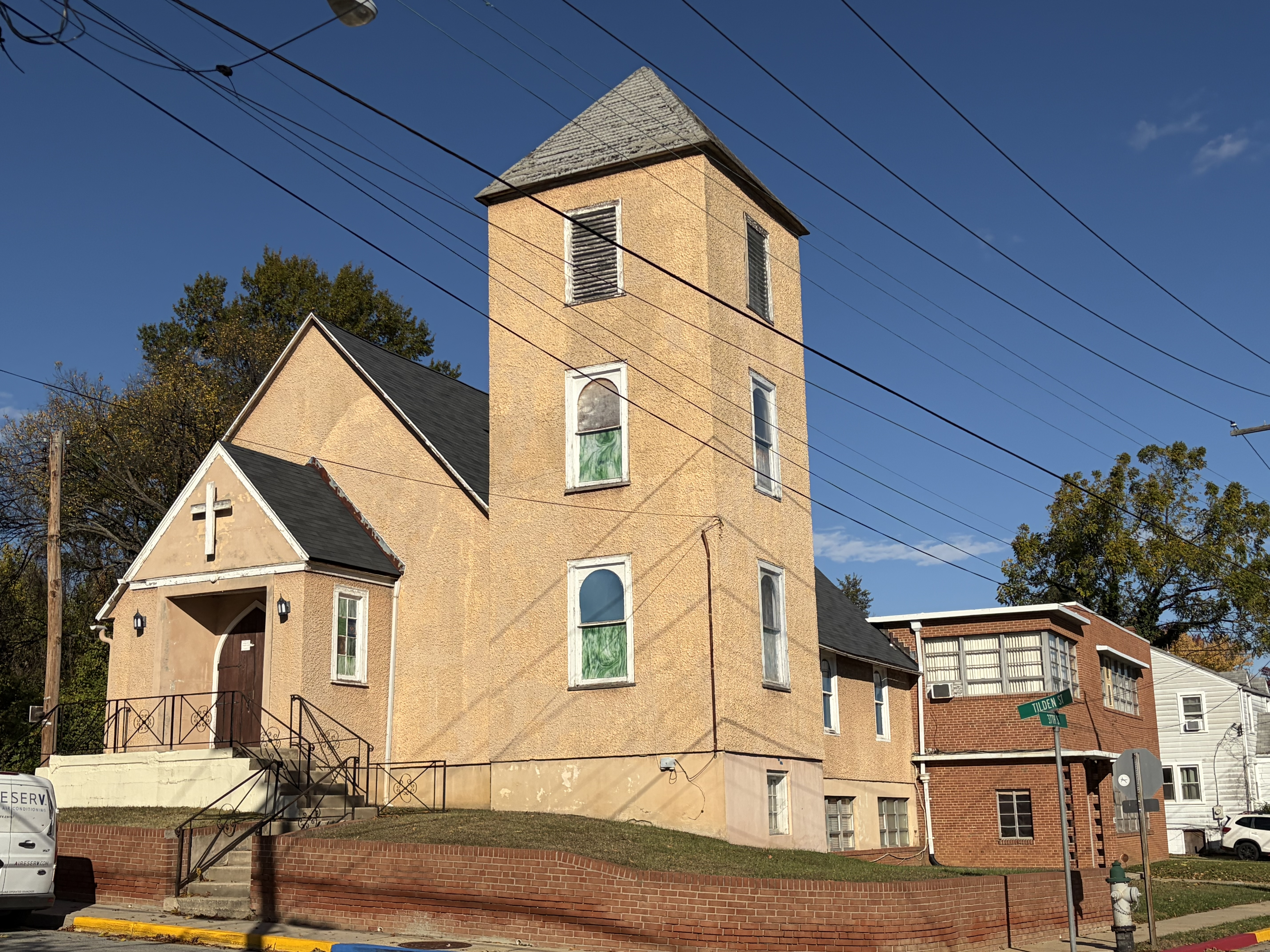
The Way of Life Church of Christ, built in 1904 as the Brentwood Methodist Church.

The community continued to grow in the early 20th century. A school was built, and the Brentwood Citizens' Association formed in 1903, a Methodist church was constructed in 1904, a fire department was started in 1905, and was formed in 1903. Kerosene street lamps were added in 1917, and electric lights were installed in 1920. When incorporated, the town included the southerly part of the Holladay Addition, the Brentwood Company subdivision, and two smaller additions. The houses built during this time consisted of small frame bungalows. Growth continued through the 1940s and 1950s, fueled by an influx of government workers. In the 1950s, many older homes were replaced and empty lots were filled with small cottages and ranch-style houses.

The majority of homes in Brentwood were built during and after World War II; young people coming to Washington, D.C., to support the war effort found a quiet place to raise their families. There are two small service-oriented commercial areas. A focal point is Bartlett Park named for Captain Bartlett who deeded the land to the town. The park is home to the Wohlfarth Building, which serves as the Town Hall.

=== 21st century ===
In 2024, Brentwood demolished its sundown town-era metal barrier erected in 1957 to separate the then majority-white Brentwood from the historically Black town of North Brentwood.

== Geography ==
Brentwood is located at 38°56′31″N 76°57′20″W (38.942011, -76.955597).

According to the United States Census Bureau, the town has a total area of 0.38 square miles (0.98 km^{2}), all land.

== Demographics ==
Historical population
Census	Pop.	Note	%±
1930	1,842		—
1940	2,433		32.1%
1950	3,523		44.8%
1960	3,693		4.8%
1970	3,426		−7.2%
1980	3,000		−12.4%
1990	3,005		0.2%
2000	2,844		−5.4%
2010	3,046		7.1%
2020	3,828		25.7%
U.S. Decennial Census; 2010 2020

=== Racial and ethnic composition ===
Brentwood town, Maryland – Racial and ethnic composition Note: the US Census treats Hispanic/Latino as an ethnic category. This table excludes Latinos from the racial categories and assigns them to a separate category. Hispanics/Latinos may be of any race.
Race / Ethnicity (NH = Non-Hispanic)	Pop 2000	Pop 2010	Pop 2020	% 2000	% 2010	% 2020
White alone (NH)	642	421	545	22.57%	13.82%	14.24%
Black or African American alone (NH)	1,381	1,118	1,079	48.56%	36.70%	28.19%
Native American or Alaska Native alone (NH)	12	7	10	0.42%	0.23%	0.26%
Asian alone (NH)	60	57	83	2.11%	1.87%	2.17%
Native Hawaiian or Pacific Islander alone (NH)	0	0	4	0.00%	0.00%	0.10%
Other race alone (NH)	6	8	31	0.21%	0.26%	0.81%
Mixed race or Multiracial (NH)	71	56	115	2.50%	1.84%	3.00%
Hispanic or Latino (any race)	672	1,379	1,961	23.63%	45.27%	51.23%
Total	2,844	3,046	3,828	100.00%	100.00%	100.00%

=== 2020 census ===
As of the 2020 census, Brentwood had a population of 3,828. The median age was 33.9 years. 22.7% of residents were under the age of 18 and 9.8% of residents were 65 years of age or older. For every 100 females, there were 96.2 males, and for every 100 females age 18 and over there were 94.7 males age 18 and over.

100.0% of residents lived in urban areas, while 0.0% lived in rural areas.

There were 1,271 households in Brentwood, of which 36.7% had children under the age of 18 living in them. Of all households, 34.6% were married-couple households, 23.4% were households with a male householder and no spouse or partner present, and 33.1% were households with a female householder and no spouse or partner present. About 28.7% of all households were made up of individuals, and 6.7% had someone living alone who was 65 years of age or older.

There were 1,346 housing units, of which 5.6% were vacant. The homeowner vacancy rate was 0.0% and the rental vacancy rate was 5.5%.

=== 2010 census ===
As of the census of 2010, there were 3,046 people, 933 households, and 624 families residing in the town. The population density was 8,015.8 inhabitants per square mile (3,094.9/km^{2}). There were 1,046 housing units at an average density of 2,752.6 per square mile (1,062.8/km^{2}). The racial makeup of the town was 25.9% White, 38.0% African American, 0.6% Native American, 1.9% Asian, 27.7% from other races, and 5.8% from two or more races. Hispanic or Latino of any race were 45.3% of the population.

There were 933 households, of which 41.1% had children under the age of 18 living with them, 37.1% were married couples living together, 18.3% had a female householder with no husband present, 11.5% had a male householder with no wife present, and 33.1% were non-families. 24.3% of all households were made up of individuals, and 4.4% had someone living alone who was 65 years of age or older. The average household size was 3.26 and the average family size was 3.78.

The median age in the town was 32.8 years. 26.2% of residents were under the age of 18; 10.6% were between the ages of 18 and 24; 33.4% were from 25 to 44; 22.7% were from 45 to 64; and 7% were 65 years of age or older. The gender makeup of the town was 50.6% male and 49.4% female.

=== 2000 census ===
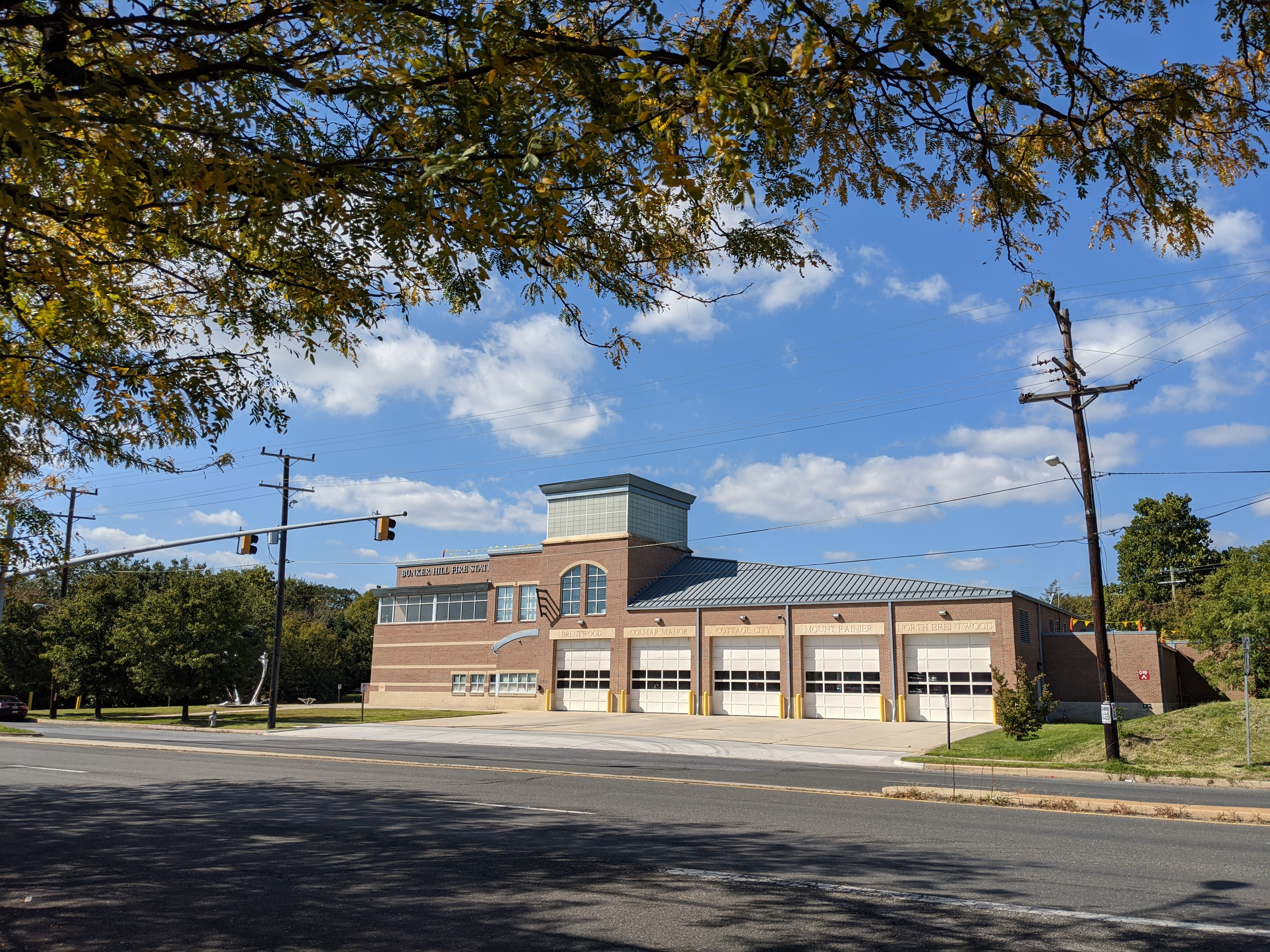
The fire station in Brentwood

As of the census of 2000, there were 2,844 people, 905 households, and 636 families residing in the town. The population density was 7,511.0 inhabitants per square mile (2,900.0/km^{2}). There were 971 housing units at an average density of 2,564.4 per square mile (990.1/km^{2}). The racial makeup of the town was 28.62% White, 49.75% African American, 0.42% Native American, 2.11% Asian, 15.05% from other races, and 4.04% from two or more races. Hispanic or Latino of any race were 23.63% of the population.

There were 905 households, out of which 39.1% had children under the age of 18 living with them, 38.8% were married couples living together, 23.0% had a female householder with no husband present, and 29.7% were non-families. 23.2% of all households were made up of individuals, and 6.4% had someone living alone who was 65 years of age or older. The average household size was 3.14 and the average family size was 3.68.

In the town, the population was spread out, with 29.0% under the age of 18, 10.2% from 18 to 24, 33.5% from 25 to 44, 19.4% from 45 to 64, and 7.8% who were 65 years of age or older. The median age was 32 years. For every 100 females, there were 96.4 males. For every 100 females age 18 and over, there were 94.2 males.

The median income for a household in the town was $45,427, and the median income for a family was $45,244. Males had a median income of $28,563 versus $27,694 for females. The per capita income for the town was $15,700. About 9.8% of families and 13.6% of the population were below the poverty line, including 22.0% of those under age 18 and 2.3% of those age 65 or over.

== Government ==
Prince George's County Police Department District 1 Station in Hyattsville serves Brentwood.

Brentwood's government system is composed of an elected mayor and four council members, who are all elected at-large. As of May 2023, the current mayor of Brentwood is Rocio Treminio-Lopez. Elections are held in May every two years on the first Monday of the month.

The United States Postal Service operates the Brentwood Post Office.

== Transportation ==
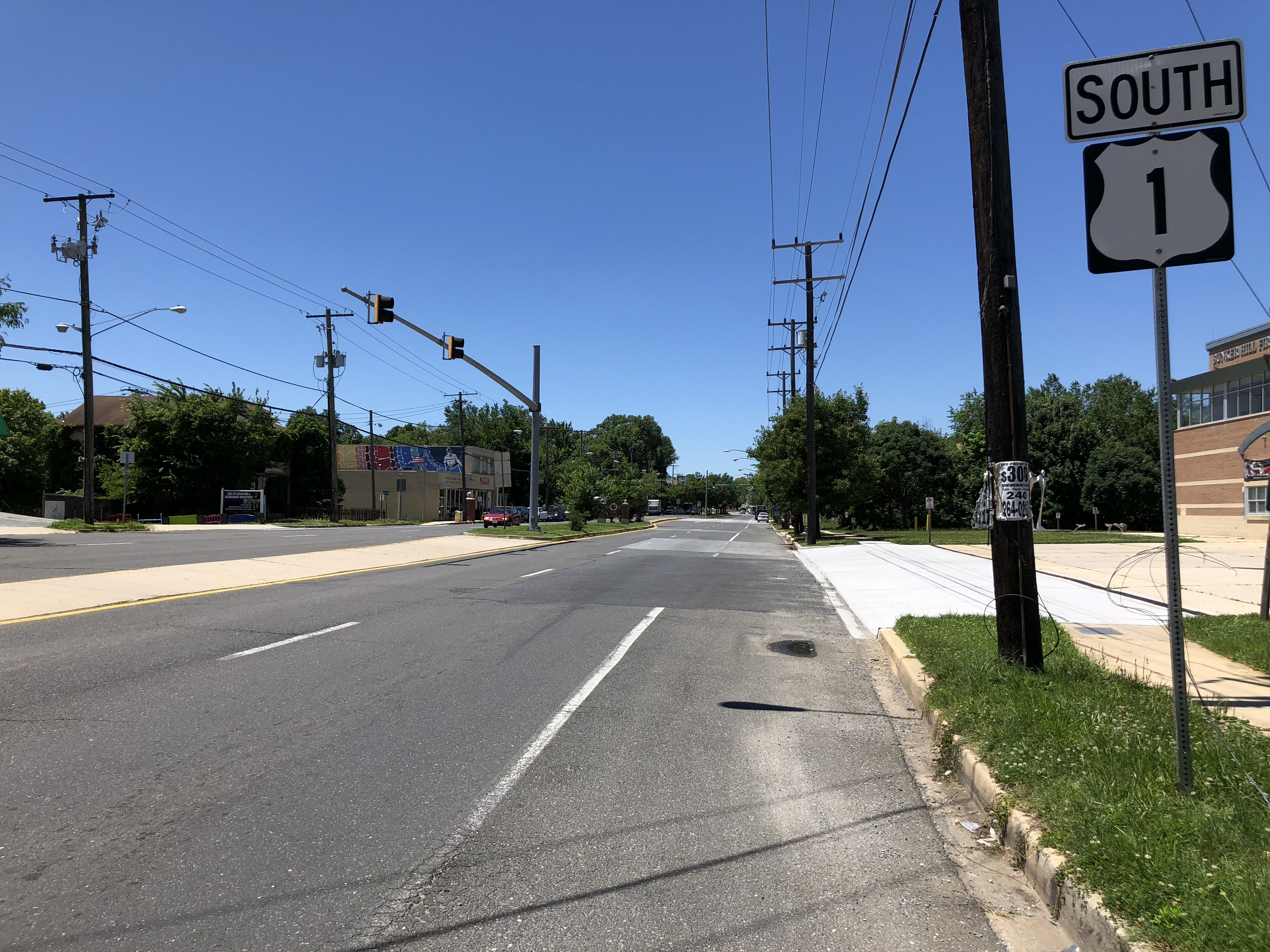
US 1 southbound in Brentwood

Two state highways serve Brentwood. The more significant of the two is U.S. Route 1, which connects southward through Mount Rainier to Washington, D.C. and northward through North Brentwood, Hyattsville and College Park to Interstate 95/Interstate 495 (the Capital Beltway). The other highway serving Brentwood is Maryland Route 208, which heads southeast to Cottage City and northwest to Hyattsville.

== Education ==
Prince George's County Public Schools operates public schools serving Brentwood.

The city of Mount Rainier has two elementary schools in its neighborhood that children who live in Brentwood can attend; Mount Rainier Elementary School and Thomas S. Stone Elementary School. Both serve grades Pre-K through 6.

Secondary schools:

- Hyattsville Middle School (in the city of Hyattsville)
- Northwestern High School (Hyattsville)

== Notable people ==
- William R. Callahan, dissident Catholic priest
- Beethaeven Scottland, professional boxer

== See also ==
- List of sundown towns in the United States
