= Chillum, Maryland =

Census-designated place in Maryland, US

- Census-designated place
- Location of Chillum, Maryland
- Coordinates: 38°58′6″N 76°58′45″W
- Country: United States
- State: Maryland
- County: Prince George's

Area
  - Total: 3.40 sq mi (8.81 km^{2})
  - Land: 3.37 sq mi (8.73 km^{2})
  - Water: 0.031 sq mi (0.08 km^{2})
- Elevation: 148 ft (45 m)

Population (2020)
  - Total: 36,039
  - Density: 10,687.6/sq mi (4,126.52/km^{2})
- Time zone: UTC−5 (Eastern (EST))
  - Summer (DST): UTC−4 (EDT)
- ZIP codes: 20782, 20783, and 20912
- Area codes: 301, 240
- FIPS code: 24-16875
- GNIS feature ID: 0597239

Chillum is an unincorporated area and census-designated place in Prince George's County, Maryland, United States, bordering Washington, D.C., and Montgomery County.

In addition to being its own unincorporated neighborhood, Chillum is also a census-designated place covering a larger area than the Chillum neighborhood. As of the 2010 census, the Chillum CDP included Chillum, as well as the adjacent unincorporated communities of Avondale, Carole Highlands, Green Meadows, and Lewisdale. The population was 36,039 at the 2020 census.

Chillum, the neighborhood, is contained between the Northwest Branch Anacostia River to the east, East West Highway (MD 410) and Sligo Creek to the north, New Hampshire Avenue (MD 650) to the west, and Eastern Avenue NE to the south. Chillum borders the adjacent communities of Avondale, Green Meadows, and Carole Highlands in Prince George's County as well as the city of Takoma Park in Montgomery County, and the Riggs Park (also known as "Lamond Riggs"), Queens Chapel, and North Michigan Park neighborhoods of Northeast Washington D.C. Actor Jonathan Banks is from Chillum.

== Geography ==
Chillum is located at 38°58′6″N 76°58′45″W (38.968210, −76.979046).

According to the United States Census Bureau, the CDP has a total area of 3.4 square miles (8.9 km^{2}), of which 3.4 square miles (8.8 km^{2}) is land and 0.039 square miles (0.1 km^{2}), or 0.94%, is water. Chillum is unincorporated and does not have its own zipcode; therefore it relies on its neighboring city of Hyattsville for its postal addresses/ zipcodes. While a vast majority of the residents living in/ businesses located in Chillum, MD are assigned the Hyattsville postal zipcodes of either 20782, or 20783, there are a few residents living on the far west side of Chillum/ businesses located very close to New Hampshire Avenue (MD 650) and the Prince George's/ Montgomery County Line, bordering the city of Takoma Park, MD, are assigned the Takoma Park, MD zipcode of 20912. Residents of Chillum that are assigned Takoma Park's 20912 zipcode have Takoma Park addresses though they are not even located within Takoma Park's boundaries. All of the other residents living in / businesses located in Chillum, have Hyattsville addresses.

== History ==
Chillum takes its name from "Chillum Castle Manor," the 4,443-acre (17.98 km^{2}) land patent established in 1763, by William Dudley Digges. It included lands in the present-day District of Columbia and in Prince George's County, and was composed of previously established land patents such as Henrietta Maria, Widows Purchase, Yarrow and Yarrow Head. Chillum Castle Manor was named after Chilham Castle, the old home of Sir Dudley Digges, an ancestor of William Dudley Digges, in Kent, England.

The manor house for the Henrietta Maria parcel was named Green Hill. It was home to William Dudley Digges and was the place where Pierre L'Enfant, designer of nearby Washington, D.C., died in destitution in 1825. He remained buried at the Green Hill property until being re-interred at Arlington National Cemetery in 1909. The Green Hill plantation was subsequently purchased by George Washington Riggs, who built the present Green Hill historic home in 1868.

Since this area was not served by public transportation, such as a streetcar, Chillum remained rural in character into the 1930s. Beginning in the mid-1930s, the area of Chillum that is close to the District of Columbia border was subdivided into lots. Developers promoted the area’s convenient access into the city as well as its water, gas, and electricity supply. The first platted developments in the late 1930s included Chillum Gardens and Oakdale Terrace. The developers of these communities sold the lots but left the construction of houses to the lot owners. Consequently, the communities were slow to develop. In contrast, the developer-built Green Meadows and Brookdale Manor were platted in the early 1940s and completed by 1942. Other developer-built communities begun in the 1940s include Chillumgate (1946) and Michigan Hills Park (1940s). Several subdivisions were constructed along Riggs Road, Sargent Road, and Sligo Creek Park in the 1950s, including Sargent Knolls (1950), Bel Air Estates (1955), Parkland (1955), Carrington (1957), and Miller Estates (mid-1950s-early 1960s). The street pattern of these communities are typical of their period. They have a grid pattern of streets broken by a few curvilinear roadways and cul-de-sacs. In addition to single-family residences, two apartment communities were constructed in 1949. The Chillum Heights Apartments consist of three story brick structures containing a combined total of 1,147 units. Larger-scale apartment complexes and mid-rise structures were constructed in the 1960s.

== Government and infrastructure ==
The Chillum-Adelphi Volunteer Fire Department (CAVFD) serves Chillum. The station is in Langley Park CDP and has an Adelphi postal address. In March 1951 and June 8, 1951, the CAVFD was established and chartered, respectively. From November and March 1953 the fire station on Riggs Road was constructed; the County Volunteer Firemen's Association designated it Station No. 34. Portions of Station No. 34 were rebuilt in the early 1960s, and it was rededicated on November 16, 1963. In 1962 the CAVFD began building a substation, No. 44, which was dedicated on November 16, 1963, but in 1992 it sold the substation to the county government. PGFD Station 844 now provides fire and EMS services to the Chillum area.

== Education ==
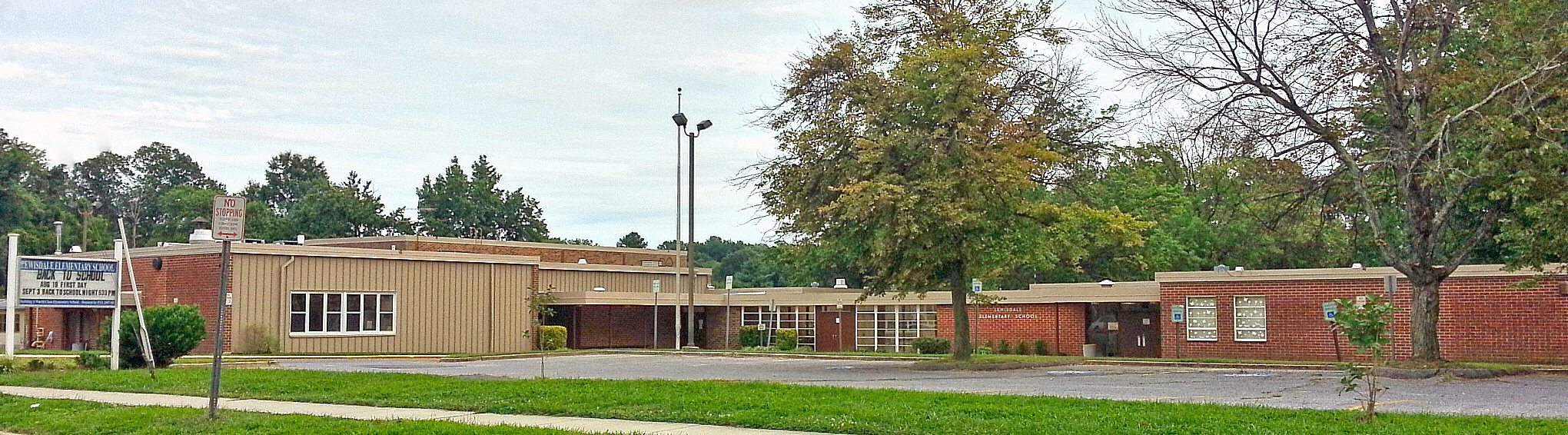
Lewisdale Elementary School

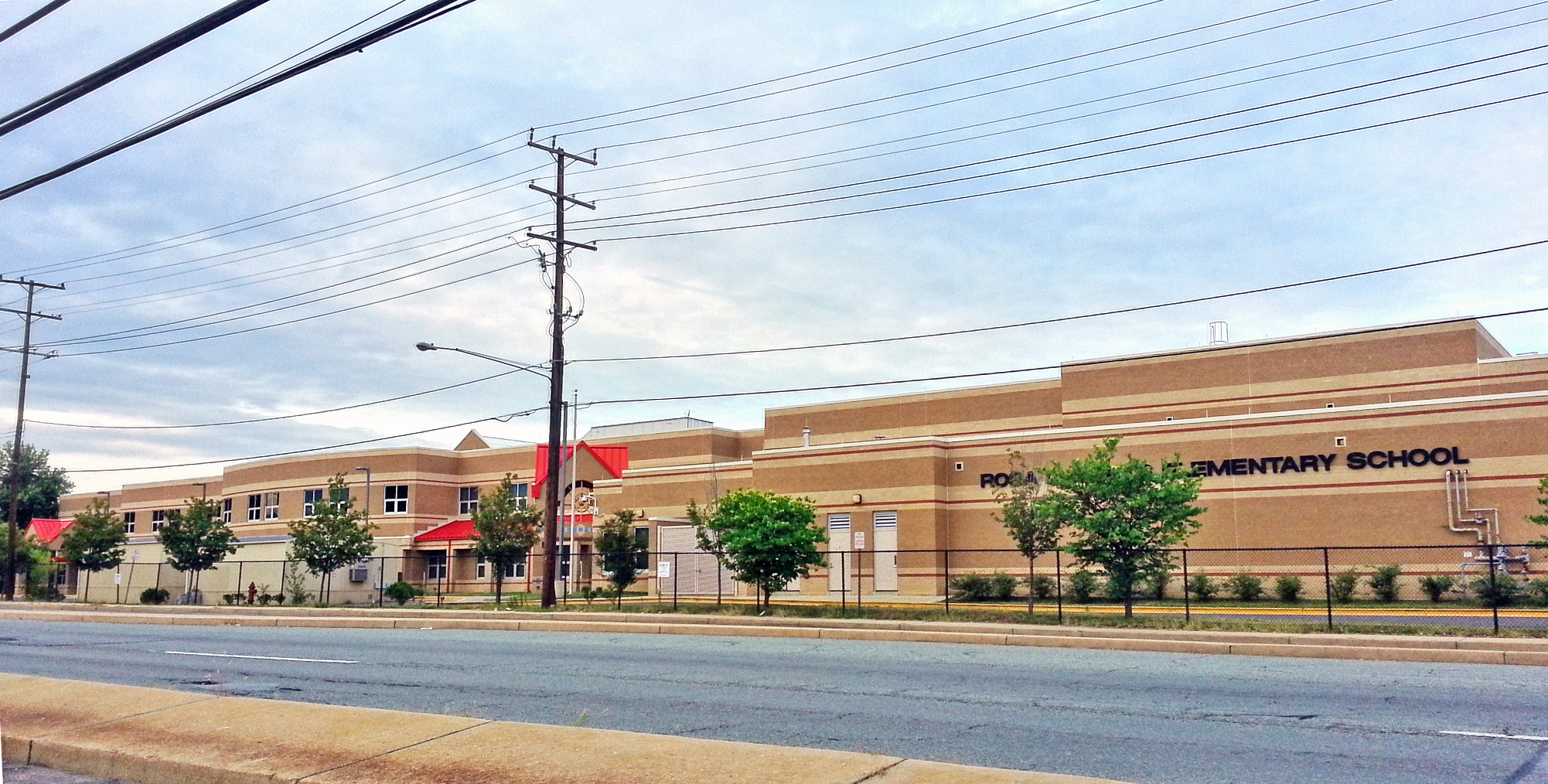
Rosa L. Parks Elementary School

The Chillum CDP is served by public schools that are part of the Prince George's County Public Schools System.

Elementary schools within the Chillum CDP include Chillum Elementary School, Cesar Chavez, Lewisdale, Rosa Parks, and Ridgecrest. Chavez was originally known as Parkway Elementary School. The school administration decided to rename the school after they found a liquor store had a similar name. According to principal Adela Acosta, the community chose Chavez since he was Hispanic/Latino as was most of the school's students. The parent-teacher organization chose Chavez, the school held a public hearing on the matter on January 10, 2000, and the county board approved the name change on March 30, 2000; it was effective fall 2000.

Carole Highlands Elementary School has a Takoma Park postal address but is within the 2010-defined Langley Park CDP boundaries. As of the 1990 US Census and the 2000 US Census, Carole Highlands Elementary, as well as all of the Langley Park CDP areas south of Road 193, was in the Chillum CDP. Carole Highlands Elementary serves parts of the current Chillum CDP.

Nicholas Orem Middle School in Hyattsville and Buck Lodge Middle School in Adelphi CDP serve sections of the CDP. Northwestern High School in Hyattsville and High Point High School in Beltsville CDP serve sections of the CDP.

In addition to these public schools, Chillum is also served by four private schools; the St. John's De La Salle School, Children's Guild School, Parkway School, and the George E. Peters Adventist School.

== Parks and recreation ==
The Chillum neighborhood is served by three parks:

1. Chillum Community Park (This park is located at the intersection of Ray Road and Cypress Creek Drive on the far east side of Chillum, located directly west of the Northwest Branch Anacostia River but directly south of the Sligo Creek River. This park is contained between two neighborhoods, Chillum and Avondale. The part of Chillum Community Park located west of the Northwest Branch Anacostia River is in Chillum while the part of Chillum Community Park located east of the Northwest Branch Anacostia River is in Avondale. Both sides of the Chillum Community Park consist of a small-size playground and small-size picnic pavilion. The only difference is that the Chillum Community Park contains a soccer field on the Chillum side while containing a small-size basketball court on the Avondale side.

2. Michigan Park Hills Neighborhood Park (This park is located at the intersection of Chillum Road and 15th Avenue, directly across the Chillum Community Park. This park consists of a small-size playground, tennis court, small basketball court, and two small benches.

3. Parklawn Community Park (This park is located on East West Highway directly east of where the Sligo Creek River intersects East West Highway. This small park with a playground, a county maintained park building, and direct access to the Sligo Creek Trail).

- In addition to these three parks, Chillum is also served by the Rollingrest Community Center/ Splash Pool, located on Sargent Road.

== Transportation ==
Several highways/ major intersections pass through the neighborhood, such as East West Highway (MD 410), New Hampshire Avenue (MD 650), Riggs Road (MD 212), Sargent Road (MD 211), Chillum Road (MD 501), and Eastern Avenue NE.

Though Chillum residents do not have direct access to the Washington Metro, there are several stations located within very close proximity to area, including the Fort Totten station in Washington D.C., which is served by the Red, Green and Yellow lines, and most of the bus routes that operate in the area ferry passengers to this station. The West Hyattsville station is located just outside Chillum's boundaries in Hyattsville and is served by the Green and Yellow lines of the Washington Metro.

== Historic sites ==
The following is a list of historic sites in Chillum identified by the Maryland-National Capital Park and Planning Commission:

	Site name	Image	Location	M-NCPPC Inventory Number	Comment
1	Green Hill		2009 Van Buren Street	65-008	Located in Lewisdale / West Hyattsville.
1	Green Hill Overseer’s House		6606 22nd Place	65-013	Located in Lewisdale / West Hyattsville.

== Demographics ==
Historical population
Census	Pop.	Note	%±
1970	35,656		—
1980	32,775		−8.1%
1990	31,309		−4.5%
2000	34,252		9.4%
2010	33,513		−2.2%
2020	36,039		7.5%
U.S. Decennial Census; 2010 2020

=== Racial and ethnic composition ===
Chillum CDP, Maryland – Racial and ethnic composition Note: the US Census treats Hispanic/Latino as an ethnic category. This table excludes Latinos from the racial categories and assigns them to a separate category. Hispanics/Latinos may be of any race.
Race / Ethnicity (NH = Non-Hispanic)	Pop 2000	Pop 2010	Pop 2020	% 2000	% 2010	% 2020
White alone (NH)	2,690	1,298	1,143	7.85%	3.87%	3.17%
Black or African American alone (NH)	21,154	16,700	14,451	61.76%	49.83%	40.10%
Native American or Alaska Native alone (NH)	87	62	36	0.25%	0.19%	0.10%
Asian alone (NH)	970	758	745	2.83%	2.26%	2.07%
Native Hawaiian or Pacific Islander alone (NH)	4	24	4	0.01%	0.07%	0.01%
Other race alone (NH)	108	119	224	0.32%	0.36%	0.62%
Mixed race or Multiracial (NH)	1,131	453	670	3.30%	1.35%	0.62%
Hispanic or Latino (any race)	8,108	14,099	18,766	23.67%	42.07%	52.07%
Total	34,252	33,513	36,039	100.00%	100.00%	100.00%

=== 2020 census ===
As of the 2020 census, Chillum had a population of 36,039. The median age was 34.0 years. 23.8% of residents were under the age of 18 and 11.7% of residents were 65 years of age or older. For every 100 females there were 98.0 males, and for every 100 females age 18 and over there were 97.5 males age 18 and over.

100.0% of residents lived in urban areas, while 0.0% lived in rural areas.

There were 11,469 households in Chillum, of which 36.9% had children under the age of 18 living in them. Of all households, 33.5% were married-couple households, 22.7% were households with a male householder and no spouse or partner present, and 35.9% were households with a female householder and no spouse or partner present. About 27.0% of all households were made up of individuals and 9.9% had someone living alone who was 65 years of age or older.

There were 12,133 housing units, of which 5.5% were vacant. The homeowner vacancy rate was 1.1% and the rental vacancy rate was 6.4%.

Racial composition as of the 2020 census
Race	Number	Percent
White	2,446	6.8%
Black or African American	14,760	41.0%
American Indian and Alaska Native	758	2.1%
Asian	766	2.1%
Native Hawaiian and Other Pacific Islander	24	0.1%
Some other race	13,626	37.8%
Two or more races	3,659	10.2%

=== 2020 American Community Survey ===
At the 2020 American Community Survey, the CDP was 31.5% Salvadoran, 4% Guatemalan, 3.6% Dominican, 3% Honduran, 2.5% Mexican, .8% Puerto Rican.

=== 2000 census ===
As of the census of 2000, there were 34,252 people, 12,080 households, and 7,900 families residing in the CDP. The population density was 8,527.2 inhabitants per square mile (3,292.4/km^{2}). There were 12,524 housing units at an average density of 3,117.9 per square mile (1,203.8/km^{2}). The racial makeup of the CDP was 14.34% White, 62.68% African American, 0.47% Native American, 2.88% Asian, 0.08% Pacific Islander, 14.49% from other races, and 5.05% from two or more races. Hispanic or Latino of any race were 23.67% of the population.

In 2000, 5.2% of Chillum residents identified as being of Jamaican heritage. This was the highest percentage of Jamaican Americans of any place in Maryland. In the same year, 9% of Chillum identified as being of West Indian ancestry. However, since the 1990s, the Hispanic/Latino population has significantly increased in Chillum, MD as immigrants from countries all over Central America found plenty of labor/ janitorial/ housekeeping jobs in the Washington D.C. area and an abundance of affordable housing in Chillum, MD that would allow them to commute very easily and conveniently to their jobs. The Hispanic/Latino population gradually increased in Chillum over the past two decades to the point where they have overtaken the African-American/Jamaican population living in the area. There are also quite a few Caribbean and African immigrants as well that began settling in Chillum since the 1990s as well. The most commonly spoken foreign language in Chillum is Spanish.

There were 12,080 households, out of which 33.6% had children under the age of 18 living with them, 36.6% were married couples living together, 21.1% had a female householder with no husband present, and 34.6% were non-families. 26.8% of all households were made up of individuals, and 7.7% had someone living alone who was 65 years of age or older. The average household size was 2.80 and the average family size was 3.40.

In the CDP, the population was spread out, with 25.8% under the age of 18, 11.5% from 18 to 24, 34.0% from 25 to 44, 19.4% from 45 to 64, and 9.3% who were 65 years of age or older. The median age was 32 years. For every 100 females, there were 92.4 males. For every 100 females age 18 and over, there were 88.3 males.

The median income for a household in the CDP was $41,307, and the median income for a family was $46,329. Males had a median income of $29,546 versus $28,069 for females. The per capita income for the CDP was $17,915. About 8.5% of families and 10.2% of the population were below the poverty line, including 11.5% of those under age 18 and 8.8% of those age 65 or over.

== Notable people ==
- Jonathan Banks, actor
