= Maryland Route 206 =

State highway in Maryland, United States

Maryland Route 206
- Maryland Route 206 highlighted in red

Route information
- Maintained by MDSHA
- Length: 3.17 mi (5.10 km)
- Existed: 2014–present

Major junctions
- South end: MD 212 near Beltsville
- MD 200 Toll in Konterra; I-95 in Konterra
- North end: Old Gunpowder Road in West Laurel

Location
- Country: United States
- State: Maryland
- Counties: Prince George's

Highway system
- Maryland highway system; Interstate; US; State; Scenic Byways
← MD 202	→ MD 208

Maryland Route 206 (MD 206) is a state highway in the U.S. state of Maryland. The highway runs 3.17 mi (5.10 km) from MD 212 near Beltsville north to Old Gunpowder Road in West Laurel in northern Prince George's County. MD 206 is called Virginia Manor Road between MD 212 and Muirkirk Road and Konterra Drive between Muirkirk Road and Old Gunpowder Road. The route has a partial interchange with MD 200 (Intercounty Connector) and an interchange with Interstate 95 (I-95) in Konterra. MD 206 was designated in 2014 along a portion of Konterra Drive near its interchange with I-95 as part of several projects centered on the completion of MD 200. The route was extended to its current termini in 2016.

== Route description ==
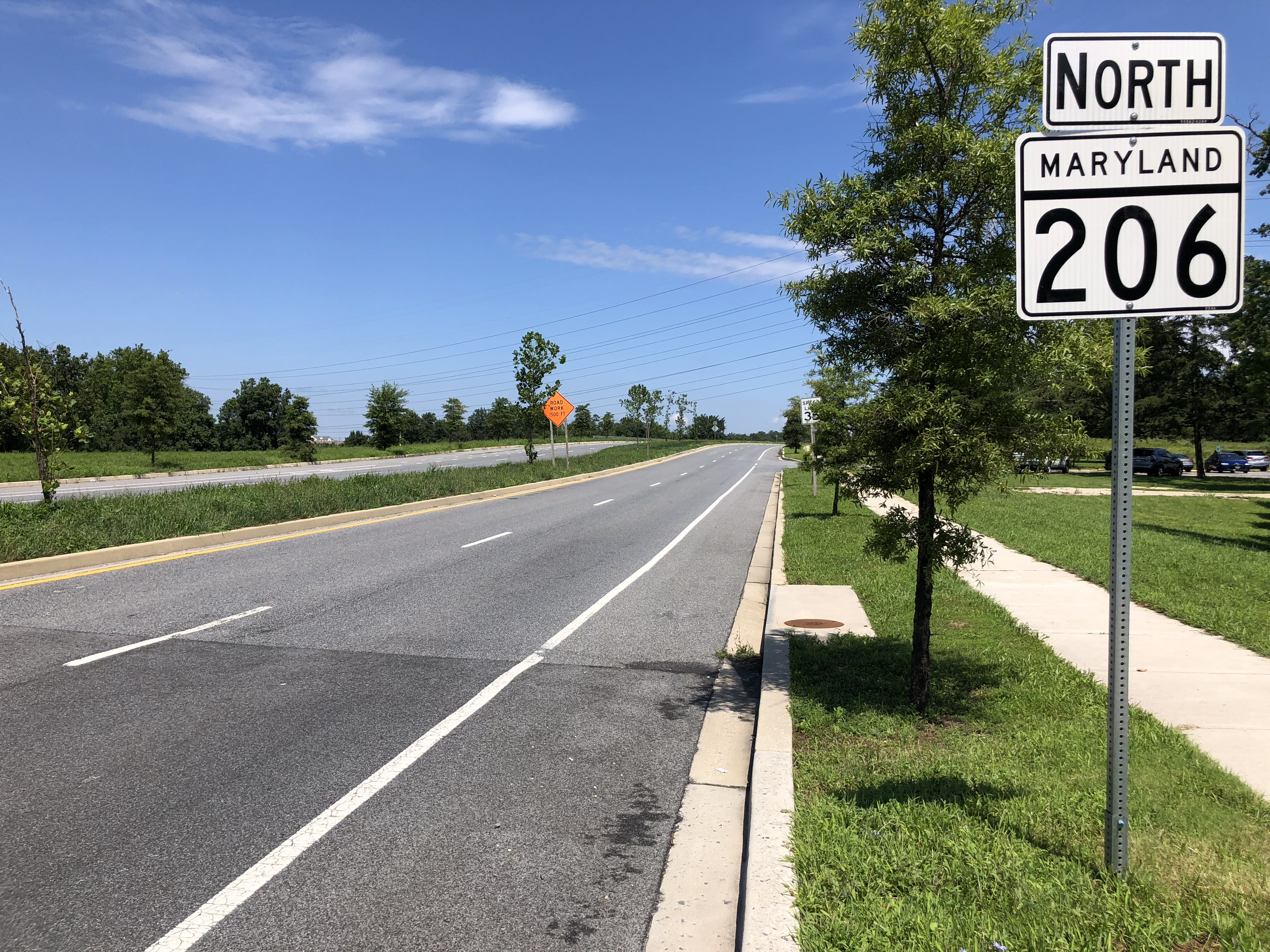
View north along MD 206 in Konterra

MD 206 begins at an intersection with MD 212, which heads west as Virginia Manor Road and east as Ritz Way toward U.S. Route 1 (US 1), near Beltsville. The route heads north as Virginia Manor Drive, a four-lane divided highway. At the intersection with Muirkirk Road, the name changes to Konterra Drive. The highway has a half-diamond interchange with MD 200 (Intercounty Connector) between the toll road's interchange with I-95 to the west and its eastern terminus at US 1; this partial interchange allows access to and from the west. At this interchange, the road intersects the western terminus of a section of the ICC Trail. North of MD 200, Konterra Drive curves to the northwest. MD 206 continues curving west and has a four-ramp partial cloverleaf interchange with I-95's collector-distributor roads, which connect MD 206 with MD 198 to the north, MD 200 to the south, and the Interstate Highway itself at the ends of the collector-distributor roads. The intersection with the ramps to and from southbound I-95 also includes the southern end of Sweitzer Lane. MD 206 continues to its northern terminus at Old Gunpowder Road.

== History ==
MD 206 was designated in 2014 as part of the construction of the eastern end of MD 200 between I-95 and US 1, the expansion of I-95 with collector-distributor lanes between MD 200 and MD 198 near Laurel, and the expansion of the existing road through Konterra and new construction through West Laurel. The original extent of the route ran along Konterra Drive from an arbitrary point a little south of the highway's intersection with Van Dusen Road north to a distance west of Sweitzer Lane. On November 7, 2016, MD 206 was extended south to MD 212 and north to Old Gunpowder Road when the state took over sections of Virginia Manor Road and Konterra Drive from the county.

== Junction list ==
The entire route is in Prince George's County.

Location	mi	km	Destinations	Notes
Konterra	0.00	0.00	MD 212 (Ritz Way/Virginia Manor Road)	Southern terminus of MD 206
Konterra	0.61	0.98	MD 200 Toll west (Intercounty Connector) to I-95 / I-270	MD 200 exit 20; access to westbound MD 200 and access from eastbound MD 200; E-ZPass or Video Tolling
Konterra	1.95	3.14	I-95 north to MD 198 – Baltimore	I-95 exit 32 (MD 206 unsigned along I-95)
West Laurel	2.34	3.77	I-95 south to MD 200 Toll (Intercounty Connector) / Sweitzer Lane north – Washington	I-95 exit 32 (MD 206 unsigned along I-95)
West Laurel	3.17	5.10	Old Gunpowder Road	Northern terminus of MD 206
1.000 mi = 1.609 km; 1.000 km = 0.621 mi: Electronic toll collection
