= Maryland Route 212 =

State highway in Prince George's County, Maryland, United States

Maryland Route 212
- MD 212 highlighted in red

Route information
- Maintained by MDSHA
- Length: 10.43 mi (16.79 km)
- Existed: 1927–present

Major junctions
- South end: Riggs Road at the District of Columbia boundary in Chillum
- MD 501 in Chillum; MD 410 in Chillum; MD 193 in Langley Park; I-95 in Beltsville; MD 206 near Beltsville; US 1 in Beltsville
- East end: MD 201 in Beltsville

Location
- Country: United States
- State: Maryland
- Counties: Prince George's

Highway system
- Maryland highway system; Interstate; US; State; Scenic Byways
← MD 210	→ MD 213

Maryland Route 212 (MD 212) is a state highway in the U.S. state of Maryland. The highway runs 10.43 miles (16.79 km) from the District of Columbia boundary in Chillum north and east to U.S. Route 1 (US 1) near Beltsville. MD 212 connects the northern Prince George's County communities of Chillum, Langley Park, Adelphi, Hillandale, Calverton, and Beltsville. The highway was constructed from Washington, D.C. to Adelphi in the early 1910s and extended north through Adelphi to Hillandale in the early 1930s. A separate portion of MD 212 was built from west of US 1 through Beltsville to what is now MD 201 in the early 1930s; the two sections were unified in the early 1940s. The route was expanded to a divided highway south of Langley Park in the early 1960s and at Interstate 95 (I-95) in the early 1970s. MD 212's eastern terminus was relocated north of Beltsville after a series of county highways were upgraded and brought into the state highway system in the 2000s and early 2010s; the old highway through Beltsville to MD 201 became MD 212A.

== Route description ==
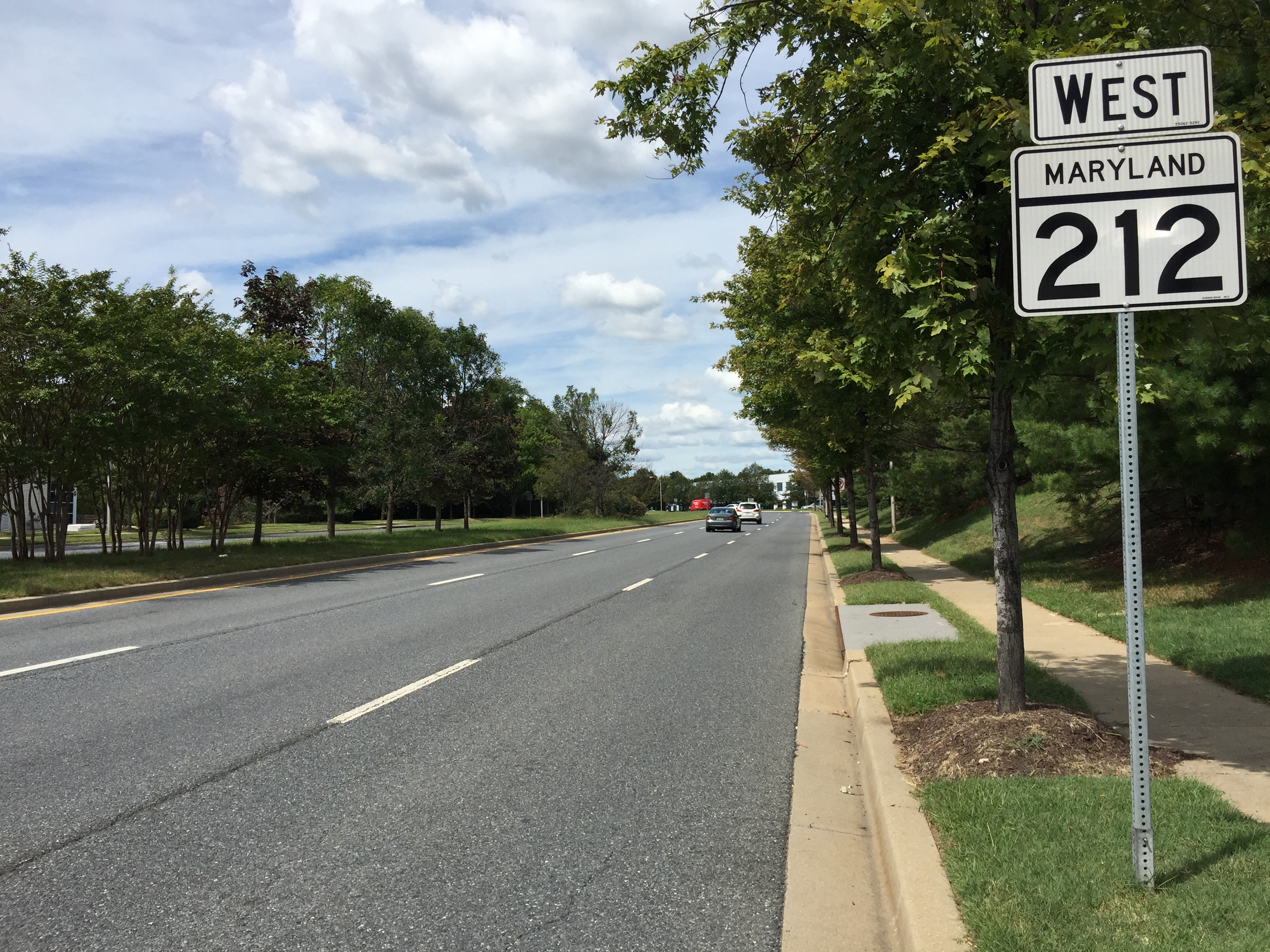
View west along MD 212 near US 1 in Beltsville

MD 212 begins at the District of Columbia boundary at Eastern Avenue in Chillum. Riggs Road continues into Washington, D.C. as a four-lane undivided highway to its southern end at North Capitol Street and Missouri Avenue. MD 212 heads northeast along Riggs Road, which is a four-lane divided highway with bike and parking lanes. A short distance north of Eastern Avenue, the highway intersects Chillum Road, which heads east as MD 501. MD 212 expands to six lanes at its intersection with Sargent Road, then crosses Sligo Creek and intersects the Sligo Creek Trail shortly before its intersection with MD 410 (East–West Highway). The highway continues north into Langley Park and intersects MD 193 (University Boulevard). North of MD 193, MD 212 veers northeast and drops to two lanes.

MD 212 crosses the Northwest Branch of the Anacostia River at the site of the historic Adelphi Mill. The highway intersects Metzerott Road and Adelphi Road and follows the edge of George Washington Cemetery as it passes through the community of Adelphi. MD 212 crosses over I-495 (Capital Beltway) with no access and completes its Riggs Road section at Powder Mill Road in Hillandale. This intersection is located just east of the Prince George's–Montgomery county line; Powder Mill Road continues west as a county highway into the latter county. MD 212 continues northeast along Powder Mill Road, which passes the U.S. Army Research Laboratory and crosses Paint Branch.

MD 212 expands to four lanes south of its intersection with Cherry Hill Road in Calverton. The highway passes northwest of High Point High School before it becomes divided at Beltsville Drive just west of its cloverleaf interchange with I-95, within which it crosses Little Paint Branch. MD 212 temporarily expands to six lanes on either side of its intersection with Old Gunpowder Road and county-maintained Powder Mill Road on the western edge of Beltsville. A short distance southeast of the intersection, Powder Mill Road again becomes state maintained as MD 212A, which passes through the center of Beltsville. MD 212 continues east as a four-lane divided highway along Ammendale Road. Just east of Indian Creek, Ammendale Road turns south from the route toward the historic Ammendale Normal Institute; the state route continues along Virginia Manor Road, which expands to six lanes as it enters an office park. When Virginia Manor Road itself splits to the northeast as MD 206, MD 212 continues southeast along Ritz Way to its official eastern terminus at US 1 just west of CSX's Capital Subdivision rail line north of Beltsville. MD 212 signage continues south along US 1 and east along MD 212A to MD 201.

== History ==
The first segment of modern MD 212 to be built as a modern road was Riggs Road from Washington to the Adelphi Mill, which was then known as the Riggs Mill. The 14-foot-wide (4.3 m) macadam road was built in two sections, the first one from Ager Road near the modern MD 410 intersection to Northwest Branch opposite the Riggs Mill by 1910. The second segment was completed from Ager Road to the District of Columbia in 1911. A third section of the road was built as a 14-foot-wide (4.3 m) concrete road from the south side of Northwest Branch to Metzerott Road in Adelphi between 1916 and 1919. Another section of concrete road was added to MD 212 from Metzerott Road to the north end of George Washington Cemetery in 1929 and 1930. The state highway was extended to Powder Mill Road by 1933. MD 212 was extended northeast along Powder Mill Road to between Paint Branch in 1933 and 1934.

Maryland Route 433
- Location: Beltsville
- Existed: 1930–c. 1946

The portion of MD 212 through Beltsville was constructed as MD 433. The highway was built as a macadam road from US 1 southeast to the entrance to the U.S. Department of Agriculture's Beltsville Agricultural Research Center at what is now MD 201 and as a concrete road from US 1 northwest to Old Gunpowder Road between 1930 and 1933. The highway followed a straight path, using what are today Cook Road and Prince Georges Avenue east and west of its at-grade Baltimore and Ohio Railroad crossing, respectively. The highway's bridge across the railroad in Beltsville was completed in 1937. The approach roads to the railroad crossing, which were surfaced with 22-foot-wide (6.7 m) concrete, were completed in 1939. The gap in Powder Mill Road between Paint Branch and Old Gunpowder Road was filled in 1942, including a bridge across Little Paint Branch. In addition, the highway from US 1 to Old Gunpowder Road was widened with a pair of 3-foot-wide (0.91 m) shoulders. MD 212 was extended east to its present terminus by 1946.

MD 212 was widened to 24 feet (7.3 m) from the District of Columbia to Northwest Branch between 1950 and 1952. This stretch was expanded to a multi-lane divided highway from Washington to MD 193 between 1961 and 1963. MD 212 was also expanded to a divided highway from Beltsville Drive to Old Gunpowder Road when the I-95 interchange was built in 1971. The project to relocate MD 212 east of I-95 started with the expansion of the two-lane county highways to which the state highway would shift. The first portion of the project, along Ritz Way and the portion of Virginia Manor Road through the office park, was completed by 2003. The second section, from the office park to west of the Ammendale Road–Virginia Manor Road intersection, was expanded in 2003. In 2007, the Maryland State Highway Administration temporarily transferred ownership of Powder Mill Road on either side of the Old Gunpowder Road intersection to Prince George's County, resulting in the designation of MD 212A for Powder Mill Road from southeast of the intersection to MD 201. In 2012, the relocated portion of Powder Mill Road and the expanded Ammendale Road, Virginia Manor Road, and Ritz Way were marked as an extension of MD 212 to US 1.

== Junction list ==
The entire route is in Prince George's County.

Location	mi	km	Destinations	Notes
Chillum	0.00	0.00	Riggs Road south / Eastern Avenue – Washington	District of Columbia boundary; southern terminus
Chillum	0.18	0.29	MD 501 east (Chillum Road) – Hyattsville	Western terminus of MD 501
Chillum	1.26	2.03	MD 410 (East–West Highway) – Takoma Park, Hyattsville	
Langley Park	2.09	3.36	MD 193 (University Boulevard) – College Park, Silver Spring	
Beltsville	8.08	13.00	I-95 – Baltimore, Washington	I-95 Exit 29
Beltsville	8.54	13.74	Old Gunpowder Road north / Powder Mill Road east	Powder Mill Road leads to MD 212A; MD 212 continues along Ammendale Road
Beltsville	10.23	16.46	MD 206 north (Virginia Manor Road)	Southern terminus of MD 206
Beltsville	10.43	16.79	US 1 (Baltimore Avenue) – Laurel, College Park	Eastern terminus; MD 212 signage continues south along US 1 and east along MD 212A to MD 201
1.000 mi = 1.609 km; 1.000 km = 0.621 mi

== Auxiliary route ==
MD 212A is the designation for the 1.95-mile (3.14 km) portion of Powder Mill Road that passes through Beltsville. The highway begins as a four-lane divided highway at a three-way junction of roads named Powder Mill Road. The north leg of the intersection heads north to the intersection of Powder Mill Road, Ammendale Road, and Old Gunpowder Road; the former two roads form the main line of MD 212. The west leg of the intersection is a two-lane undivided road that provides access to a residential subdivision. MD 212A reduces to a two-lane undivided road as it heads southeast through Beltsville. The highway intersects Rhode Island Avenue, then veers east and intersects US 1 (Baltimore Avenue). At this point, MD 212A becomes signed as MD 212. MD 212A crosses over CSX's Capital Subdivision rail line and meets the northern end of MD 694 (Agricultural Farm Road) opposite Cook Road. The highway veers southeast and crosses Indian Creek before reaching its eastern terminus at Edmonston Road. Edmonston Road heads south as MD 201 toward Greenbelt. Powder Mill Road continues east as a federally maintained highway through the Beltsville Agricultural Research Center. MD 212A was part of the main line of MD 212 until 2007, when the route designation was split by a transfer of the highway around the Gunpowder Road intersection to county maintenance; the eastern segment through Beltsville became MD 212A.
