= High Point High School =

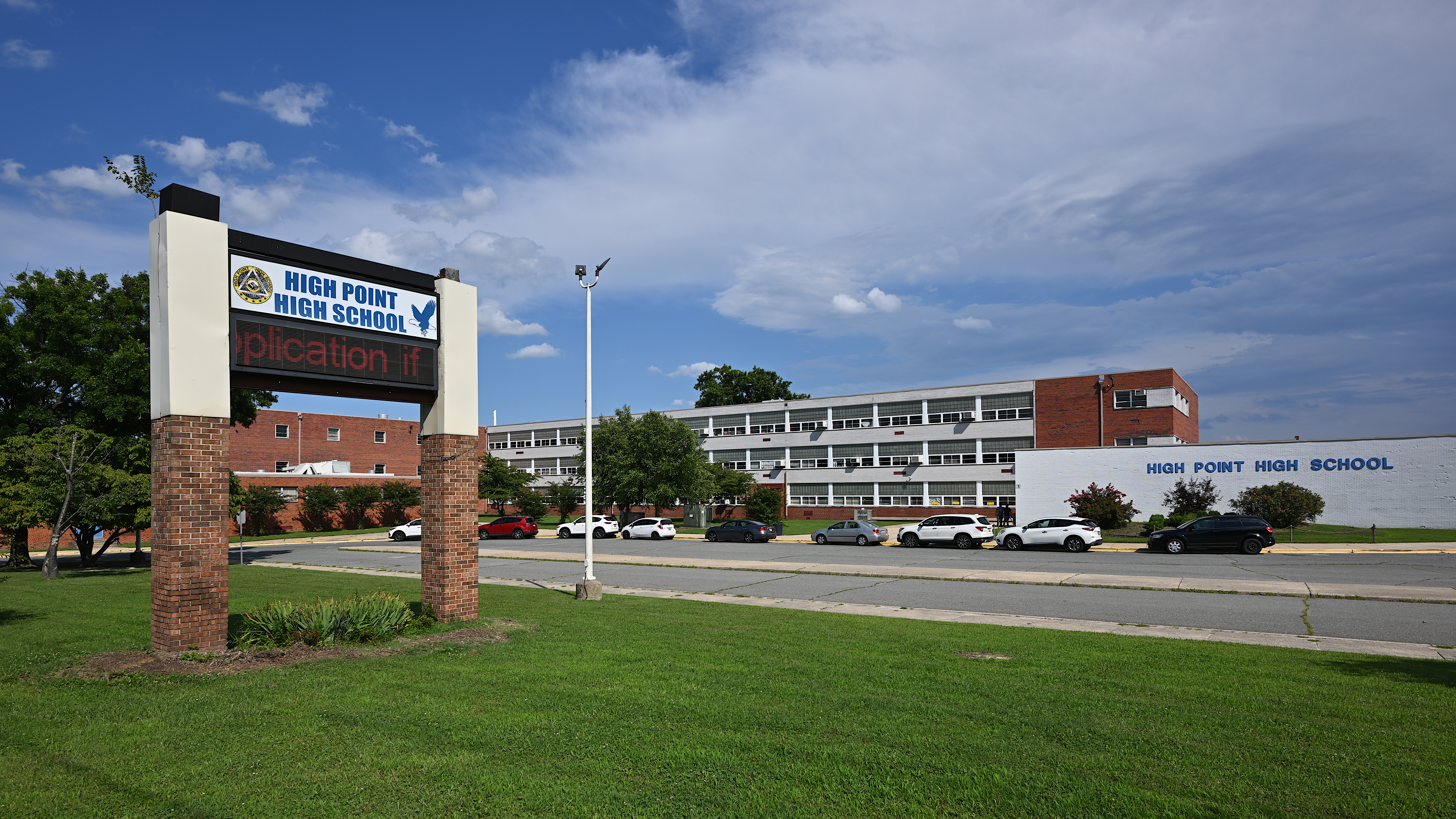

Location
- 3601 Powder Mill Road; Beltsville, Maryland 20705; United States; 39°2′33″N 76°56′38″W

Information
- Type: Public high school
- Established: 1954
- School district: Prince George's County Public Schools
- Superintendent: Dr. Shawn Joseph
- Principal: Miguel Chacon
- Teaching staff: 138.20 (FTE)
- Grades: 9-12
- Enrollment: 2,972 (2025-2026)
- Student to teacher ratio: 17.55
- Colors: Blue and Gold
- Nickname: Eagles
- Website: www.pgcps.org/highpoint/

High Point High School (HPHS) is a public high school located in Beltsville, an unincorporated section of Prince George's County, Maryland, United States. The school, serving children in grades 9 through 12, is part of the Prince George's County Public Schools district system.

It is outside Interstate 495 (Capital Beltway) and in proximity to Interstate 95.

== History ==
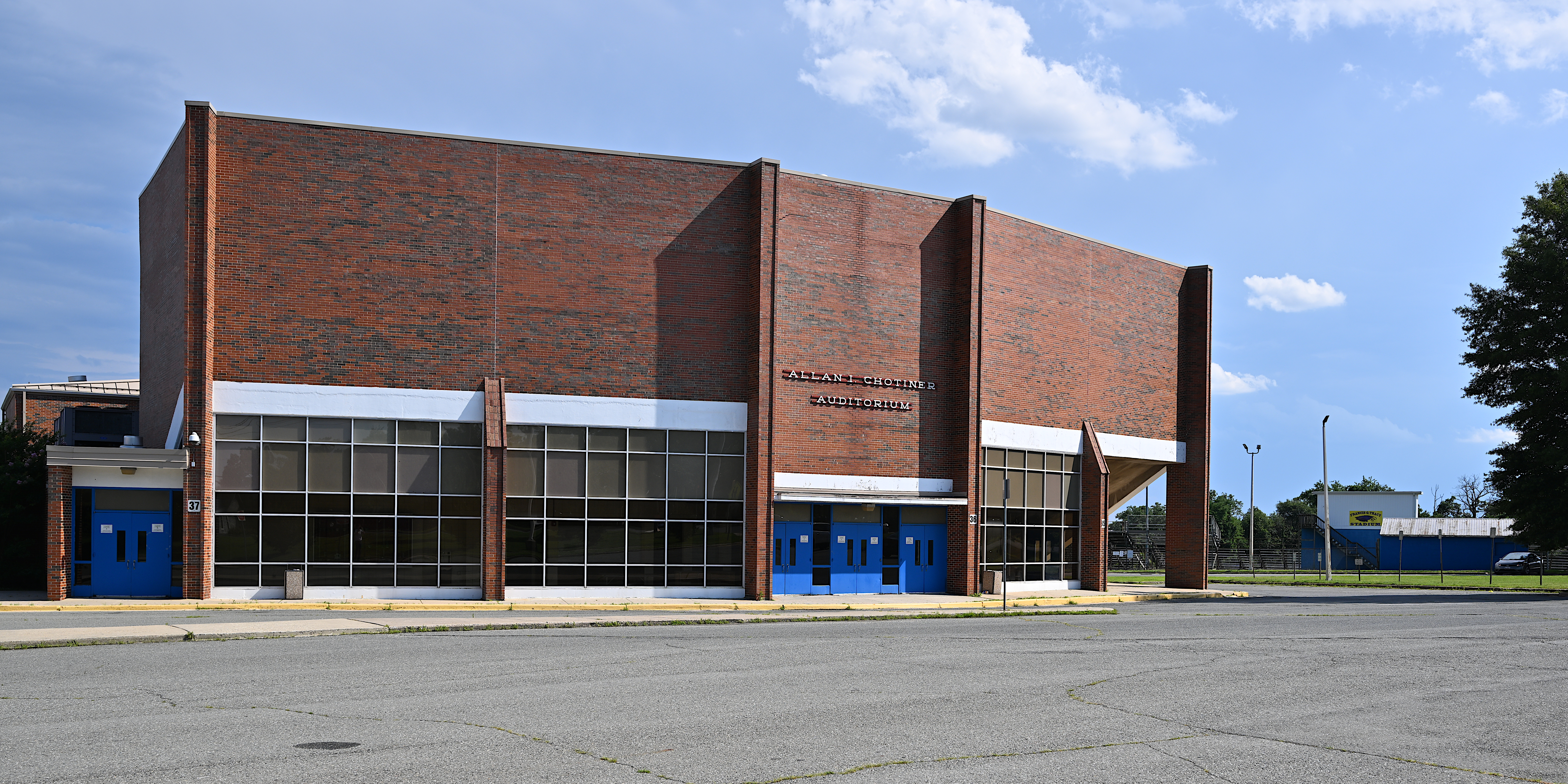
The auditorium that is in the same place as the school.

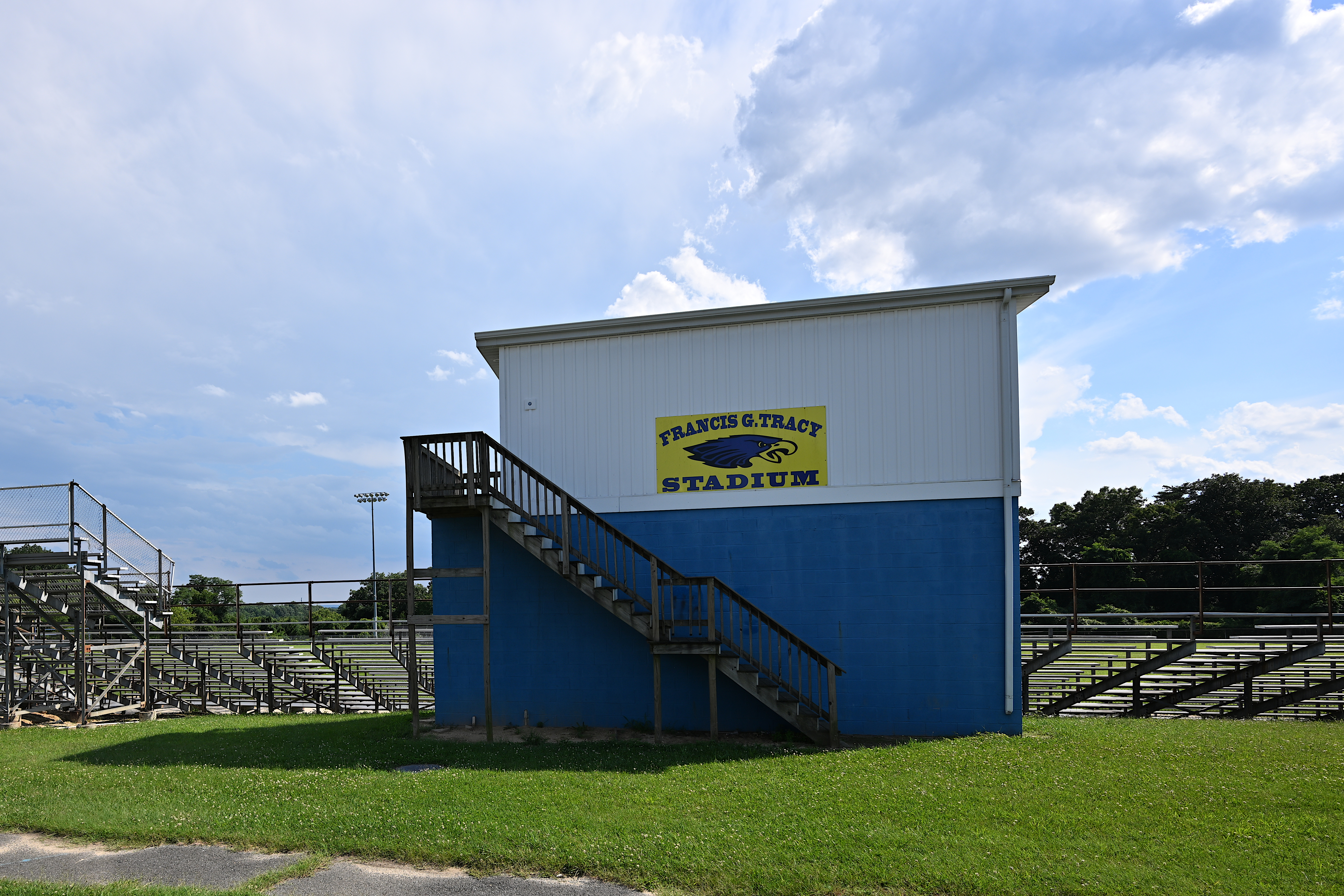

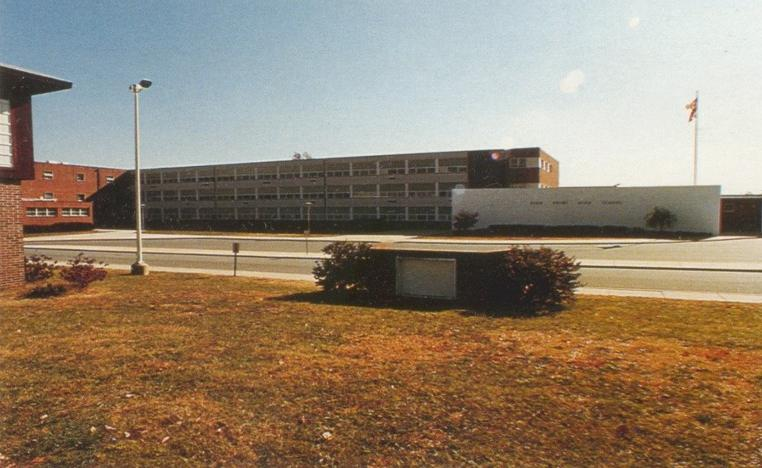
This is a picture of the school in 1989.

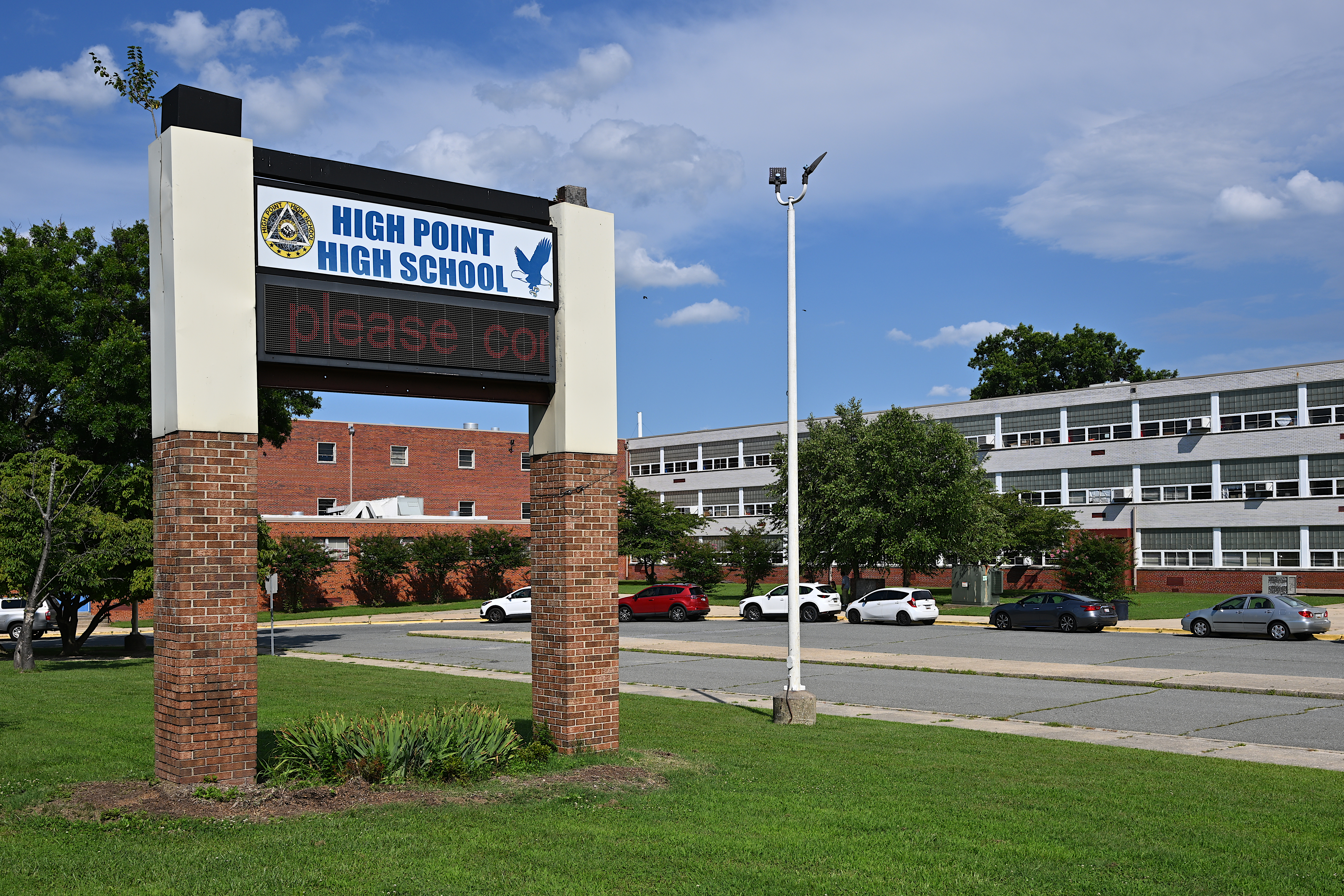

Opened in fall 1954, High Point High School was originally going to be named Cherry Hill High School. However, school officials eventually settled on the name "High Point High School" because of the school's location on what residents believed to be the highest point in the county. (Note: The highest point in Prince George's County is located about 3 miles (4.8 km) north along Brooklyn Bridge road in Hillsborough) Upon its opening High Point High began serving Greenbelt, and the former Greenbelt High School became Greenbelt Junior High School. By the late 1950s High Point used a "split class" system as it was over capacity. Greenbelt is now served by Eleanor Roosevelt High School, which was scheduled to open in fall 1976.

High Point received the Siemens Award for Advanced Placement in 2004. High Point was ranked #1,361 on Newsweek's Top 1500 Public High Schools in America, in 2010. U.S. News & World Report named High Point a Silver Medal School in 2010.

In 2014, the district's board agreed to do a feasibility study on building a new school building. By 2017, the existing building had 2,700 students when it was designed for around 2,100 students.

== Demographics ==
The demographic breakdown of the 2,972 students enrolled for the 2025–2026 school year was:

- Gender:
  - Male - 53.3%
  - Female - 46.7%
- Ethnicity:
  - Asian/Pacific Islanders - 3.1%
  - Black - 13%
  - Hispanic - 83%
  - White - 0.9%
  - Other - 0.3%

65% of the students qualified for free or reduced lunch. This is a Title I school. Around 292 students in High Point High are multilingual.

As of 2006, many residents of northern PG County are of Hispanic and Latino ancestry, contributing to a large enrollment of Hispanic and Latino students at High Point High. In 2016 Sandra Jimenez, the principal at the time, described the school as a "Central American Ellis Island" in an interview with NPR.

Communities within the school's attendance zone include: the unincorporated census designated places (CDP) of Adelphi, Beltsville, and Langley Park, and portions of the CDPs of Chillum and Konterra, as well as the sections of Calverton and Hillandale CDPs in PG County. Also within the boundary is a portion of the City of College Park. Scott, et al. stated in a 2014 paper published by think tank The Urban Institute that, as of March 2013, 23% of High Point students came from Langley Park.

== Academics ==
In 1987, the largest English as a second language (ESOL) program in the school district was in High Point High; this program began in 1969, and the school in 1987 had the largest population of students originating from outside the United States of any PG County high school. As of 2018, the ESOL program includes ESOL 1–3, Advanced Critical Reading, AIM, Language of American History, Language of Math, and Language of Science classes.

In 1987, it had classes in six foreign languages, and the school district was considering making High Point a magnet school for foreign languages. That year it received 200% of the number of requests for transferring into the school that each other PG County high school got.

== Student discipline ==
A paper in 2014 by Scott et al. stated that High Point students, compared to students of other high schools in the district, "have a less positive perception of school safety and discipline".

In the 2011–12 school year, 36% of 9th grade students from Langley Park, who attended High Point, did not go to school for at least 20 days per school year compared to 29% district average for 9th graders and 10% district average for 7th and 8th graders; the Langley Park 7th and 8th graders truancy rate was the same as the district average. Scott, et al. stated that a possible reason was that start time of High Point was the same as that of Buck Lodge Middle School even though the high school's distance from Langley Park was 4 miles (6.4 km) longer than that of the middle school.

During the period of Michael Brooks as principal, some parents, guardians and students stated that his responses to incidents of fighting and truant students were insufficient. In 2011, the district placed the assistant principal, as an interim principal after a video of a fight at the school appeared on YouTube.

== Athletics ==
High Point High has an American football team. In 2013, Chelsea Janes of The Washington Post stated it had been "a long time since" the team had performed strongly, but that it was regaining its power. The school also fields boys' and girls' soccer teams, as well as smaller teams for volleyball, track, basketball and baseball.

== Notable alumni ==
- Martin Berkofsky (1961) American classical pianist
- Frank Cho (1990), comic book writer and illustrator
- A. Jamie Cuticchia (1984), scientist
- Raheem DeVaughn, musician
- Fred Funk, former coach of University of Maryland golf team and PGA tour player
- Jolene Ivey, Maryland state legislator
- David Jackson, basketball player
- Kevin Jordan, NFL player
- Elijah Joy, TV personality
- Brian Reid (1966), internet innovator
- Doug Spearman, actor
- Paula Vogel (1969), playwright
