= Konterra, Maryland =

- CDP
- Location within Maryland Location within the United States
- Coordinates: 39°04′12″N 76°53′54″W
- Country: United States
- State: Maryland
- County: Prince George's

Area
  - Total: 6.13 sq mi (15.87 km^{2})
  - Land: 6.07 sq mi (15.71 km^{2})
  - Water: 0.062 sq mi (0.16 km^{2})
- Elevation: 138 ft (42 m)

Population (2020)
  - Total: 3,158
  - Density: 520.7/sq mi (201.03/km^{2})
- Time zone: UTC−5 (Eastern (EST))
  - Summer (DST): UTC−4 (EDT)
- Area codes: 301, 240
- FIPS code: 24-44715

Konterra is an unincorporated area and census-designated place (CDP) in Prince George's County, Maryland, United States. The population was 3,158 at the 2020 census.

Parts of Konterra were previously defined by the U.S. Census Bureau as being in the West Laurel census-designated place.

== Geography ==
Konterra is located at 39°04′13″N 76°53′55″W.

According to the United States Census Bureau, the CDP has a total area of 6.4 square miles (16.5 km^{2}), of which 6.3 square miles (16.4 km^{2}) is land and 0.04 square miles (0.1 km^{2}), or 1.05%, is water.

Konterra is located in northern Prince George's County, around the interchange of Interstate 95 and Maryland Route 200. The city of Laurel borders the CDP to the northeast. West Laurel lies to the north, and South Laurel is to the east. Beltsville is to the south, and Calverton is to the southwest. To the northwest, in Montgomery County, is Burtonsville.

== Demographics ==
Historical population
Census	Pop.	Note	%±
2010	2,527		—
2020	3,158		25.0%
U.S. Decennial Census; 2010 2020

Konterra first appeared as a census designated place in the 2010 U.S. census formed from part of West Laurel CDP and additional area.

=== Racial and ethnic composition ===
Konterra CDP, Maryland – Racial and ethnic composition Note: the US Census treats Hispanic/Latino as an ethnic category. This table excludes Latinos from the racial categories and assigns them to a separate category. Hispanics/Latinos may be of any race.
Race / Ethnicity (NH = Non-Hispanic)	Pop 2010	Pop 2020	% 2010	% 2020
White alone (NH)	635	551	25.13%	17.45%
Black or African American alone (NH)	1,238	1,581	48.99%	50.06%
Native American or Alaska Native alone (NH)	2	10	0.08%	0.32%
Asian alone (NH)	303	486	11.99%	15.39%
Native Hawaiian or Pacific Islander alone (NH)	0	0	0.00%	0.00%
Other race alone (NH)	4	18	0.16%	0.57%
Mixed race or Multiracial (NH)	62	114	2.45%	3.61%
Hispanic or Latino (any race)	283	398	11.20%	12.60%
Total	2,527	3,158	100.00%	100.00%

=== 2020 census ===
As of the 2020 census, Konterra had a population of 3,158. The median age was 50.4 years. 16.4% of residents were under the age of 18 and 31.3% of residents were 65 years of age or older. For every 100 females there were 84.5 males, and for every 100 females age 18 and over there were 75.3 males age 18 and over.

100.0% of residents lived in urban areas, while 0.0% lived in rural areas.

There were 1,278 households in Konterra, of which 22.3% had children under the age of 18 living in them. Of all households, 48.8% were married-couple households, 11.5% were households with a male householder and no spouse or partner present, and 35.5% were households with a female householder and no spouse or partner present. About 30.1% of all households were made up of individuals and 21.0% had someone living alone who was 65 years of age or older.

There were 1,319 housing units, of which 3.1% were vacant. The homeowner vacancy rate was 1.7% and the rental vacancy rate was 4.9%.

== Education ==
The residents are zoned to schools of Prince George's County Public Schools. Zoned schools serving sections of the CDP include:

Elementary schools:

- Bond Mill Elementary School in West Laurel
- Chesapeake Math and IT Academy North Elementary in West Laurel
- Vansville Elementary School in an unincorporated area

Middle Schools:

- Chesapeake Math and IT Academy North Middle in West Laurel
- Martin Luther King Middle School in Beltsville.

High schools:

- Chesapeake Math and IT Academy North High in West Laurel
- Laurel High School in Laurel
- High Point High School in Beltsville
