= Laurel High School (Maryland) =

Public high school in Maryland, U.S.

Location
- 8000 Cherry Lane; Laurel, Maryland 20707; United States; 39°05′39″N 76°52′05″W

Information
- School type: Public, high school
- Established: 1899; 127 years ago
- Principal: Michael Dinkins
- Teaching staff: 106.00 (FTE) (2016–17)
- Enrollment: 1,844 (2016–17)
- Student to teacher ratio: 17.40:1 (2016–17)
- Colors: Blue; Gold
- Mascot: Spartan
- Website: www.pgcps.org/laurelhs/

Laurel High School is a public high school located in Laurel, Maryland, United States; it is the oldest school in the Prince George's County Public Schools system.

The school serves Laurel, portions of Konterra, South Laurel, and West Laurel.

== History ==
Laurel High School was founded in 1899 with an enrollment of 59 students and four teachers. According to The Washington Post, the 1900 graduating class was all women. The original school building was listed on the National Register of Historic Places in 1979. In 1965, the school moved to a larger building at 8000 Cherry Lane in Laurel, and annexed the former Margaret A. Edmonson Elementary School in 1983. The last class at the original location held a 50th reunion in 2015.

Fulfilling an objective of the Prince George's County Capital Improvement Program since 1989, construction on a new 800-seat auditorium for the school was expected to begin in February 2009. The addition was completed in the early 2010 school year.

Laurel High's student newspaper, "The Shield", established in the 1995–1996 school year, has won awards from the American Scholastic Press Association and the Columbia Scholastic Press Association. Prior to the 1995–96 school year, the school paper operated under the name "The Tattler".

Laurel shares the same layout as Bowie High School, in neighboring Bowie, Maryland. Laurel High School currently enrolls roughly 2,000 students in grades 9 through 12. The school mascot is the Spartan, and the school colors are blue and gold.

In 2009, Sheryll Cashin said in The Failures of Integration: How Race and Class are Undermining the American Dream that Laurel High was one of several mostly black, mostly middle class Prince George's County public high schools that were "decidedly underachieving: fewer than half of the seniors at these schools went on to attend four-year colleges in recent years."

In 2022, Laurel High School was one of the four schools in PGCPS that faced bomb threats. Another bomb threat targeted Laurel High School in 2024.

== Notable alumni ==
- Mike Bullock – writer, musician
- Shari Elliker – radio personality
- Marty Friedman – guitarist (former lead of Megadeth)
- Gertrude Poe – journalist, lawyer, real estate agent, insurance agent, and radio broadcaster
- Angie Vaughn – track and field athlete
- Ray Vigliotti – soccer player
- Alonzo T. Washington – politician
- Tico Wells – actor
