= Maryland Route 200 =

Toll highway in Maryland, United States

Maryland Route 200 Toll
- Intercounty Connector
- Maryland Route 200's routing highlighted in red

Route information
- Maintained by MDTA
- Length: 17.468 mi (28.112 km)
- Existed: February 23, 2011–present
- History: Completed on November 7, 2014

Major junctions
- West end: I-370 near Gaithersburg
- MD 97 in Norbeck; MD 182 in Aspen Hill; MD 650 in Colesville; US 29 in Fairland; I-95 in Laurel; MD 206 in Konterra
- East end: US 1 near Laurel

Location
- Country: United States
- State: Maryland
- Counties: Montgomery, Prince George's

Highway system
- Maryland highway system; Interstate; US; State; Scenic Byways
← MD 198	→ MD 201

Maryland Route 200 (MD 200), also known as the Intercounty Connector or ICC, is an 18.8-mile (30.3 km) controlled-access toll road in the U.S. state of Maryland. It connects Gaithersburg in Montgomery County and Laurel in Prince George's County, both of which are suburbs of Washington, D.C. The ICC was one of the most controversial Maryland road projects; opposition to the highway stalled the project for decades, and construction did not begin until 60 years after the highway's initial approval.

The highway was originally proposed in 1950, was 32 miles (51 km) in length, and part of the Washington Outer Beltway. While other parts of the Outer Beltway were canceled, the ICC and the Fairfax County Parkway remained on master plans. The road's long history as an unbuilt proposed road stems from the controversy that has surrounded it over the years, including the cost of about $2.38 billion to complete the highway and related environmental mitigation.

Proponents of the highway claimed that it would improve the flow of interregional traffic, relieve traffic congestion on local roads, spur economic development, and enhance access to Baltimore-Washington International Airport. Opponents of the highway claimed that the road would instead harm significant traffic flow characteristics, harm the environment, and disrupt established communities through which it passes. They also argued that "environmental degradation would immediately occur from the construction (loss of forests, wetlands, and animal habitats), [and instill] long-term consequences (air pollution and carbon emissions from additional driving, more sprawl development, less money to fund mass transit projects, etc.)."

Fulfilling a 2002 campaign promise, Governor Robert Ehrlich pushed to begin construction of the road and conducted a formal groundbreaking in October 2006. With additional support from his successor, Governor Martin O'Malley, construction began on November 13, 2007. The first segment, from Interstate 370 (I-370) to MD 28, opened on February 23, 2011, while the extension to I-95 opened on November 22, 2011. The final segment to U.S. Route 1 (US 1) opened on November 7, 2014. MD 200 uses all-electronic tolling, with tolls payable through E-ZPass or Video Tolling.

== Route description ==
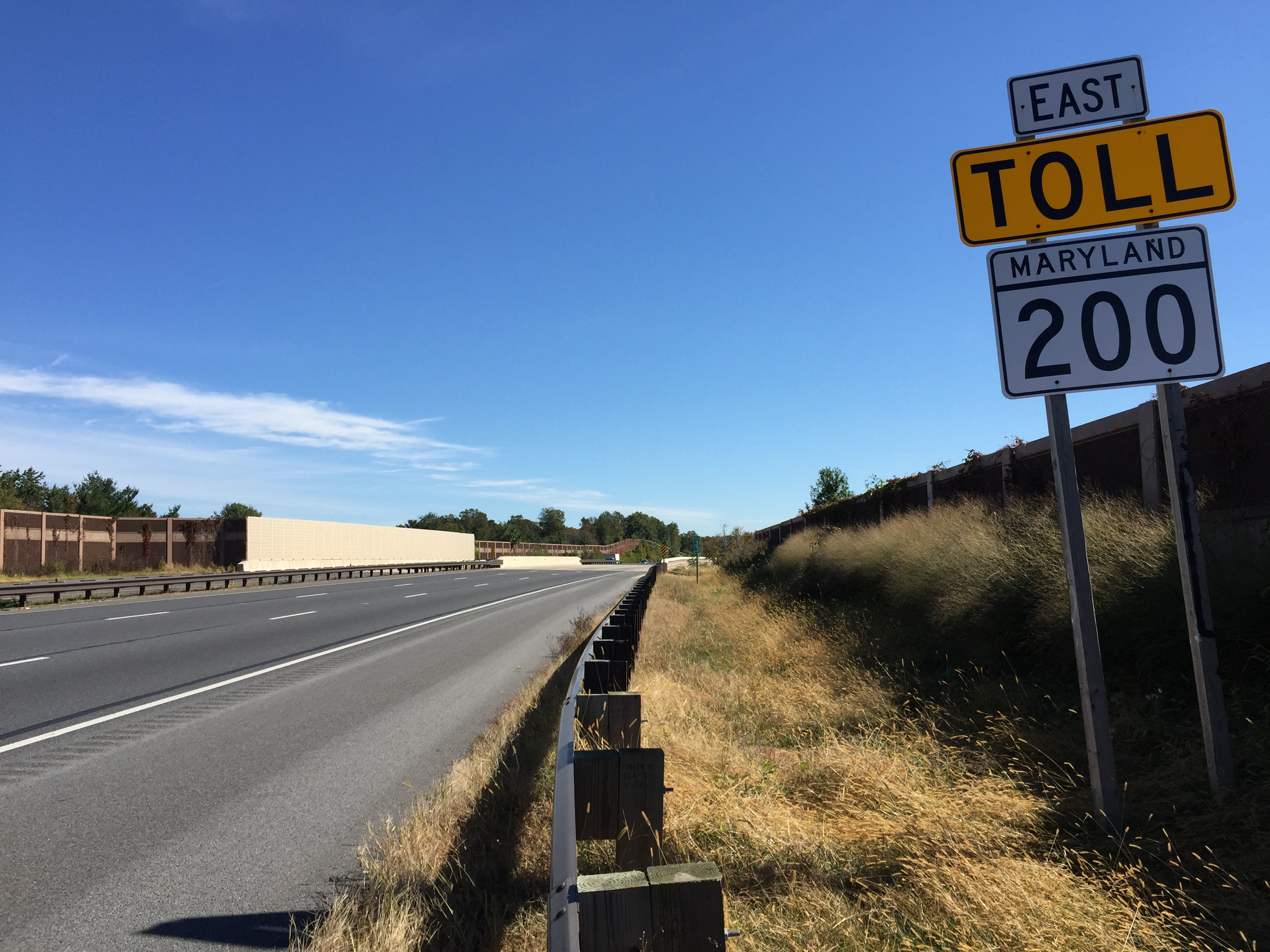
MD 200 eastbound in Redland near its western terminus at I-370

MD 200 begins at a trumpet interchange with MD 200A (Metro Access Road), which heads south to provide access to Shady Grove Road and the Shady Grove station serving Washington Metro's Red Line, near Gaithersburg in Montgomery County; west of this interchange the freeway continues as I-370 toward MD 355 and I-270. Several new ramps and collector-distributor roads were built between this interchange and MD 355. MD 200 continues northeast from there as a six-lane freeway through Redland Station, turning east to pass over Shady Grove Road, and then under Redland Road, paralleling Mill Creek. This is the location of the eastbound toll gantry. MD 200 shortly curves to the east on the approach to the six-lane overpass for Olde Mill Run, which was built as a 600-foot (182.9 m) cut-and-cover tunnel to reduce the impact on the Winters Run neighborhood. The Olde Mill Run overpass is the only section of MD 200 with full 12-foot (3.7 m) shoulders on each side and right-of-way for a future fourth lane in the eastbound direction. After the overpass, MD 200 turns southeast, passing over Rock Creek and the Upper Rock Creek Trail and under Needwood Road, before turning sharply back to the east as it passes under MD 115 (Muncaster Mill Road). The route, now running slightly to the southeast, begins the approach to MD 97 (Georgia Avenue).

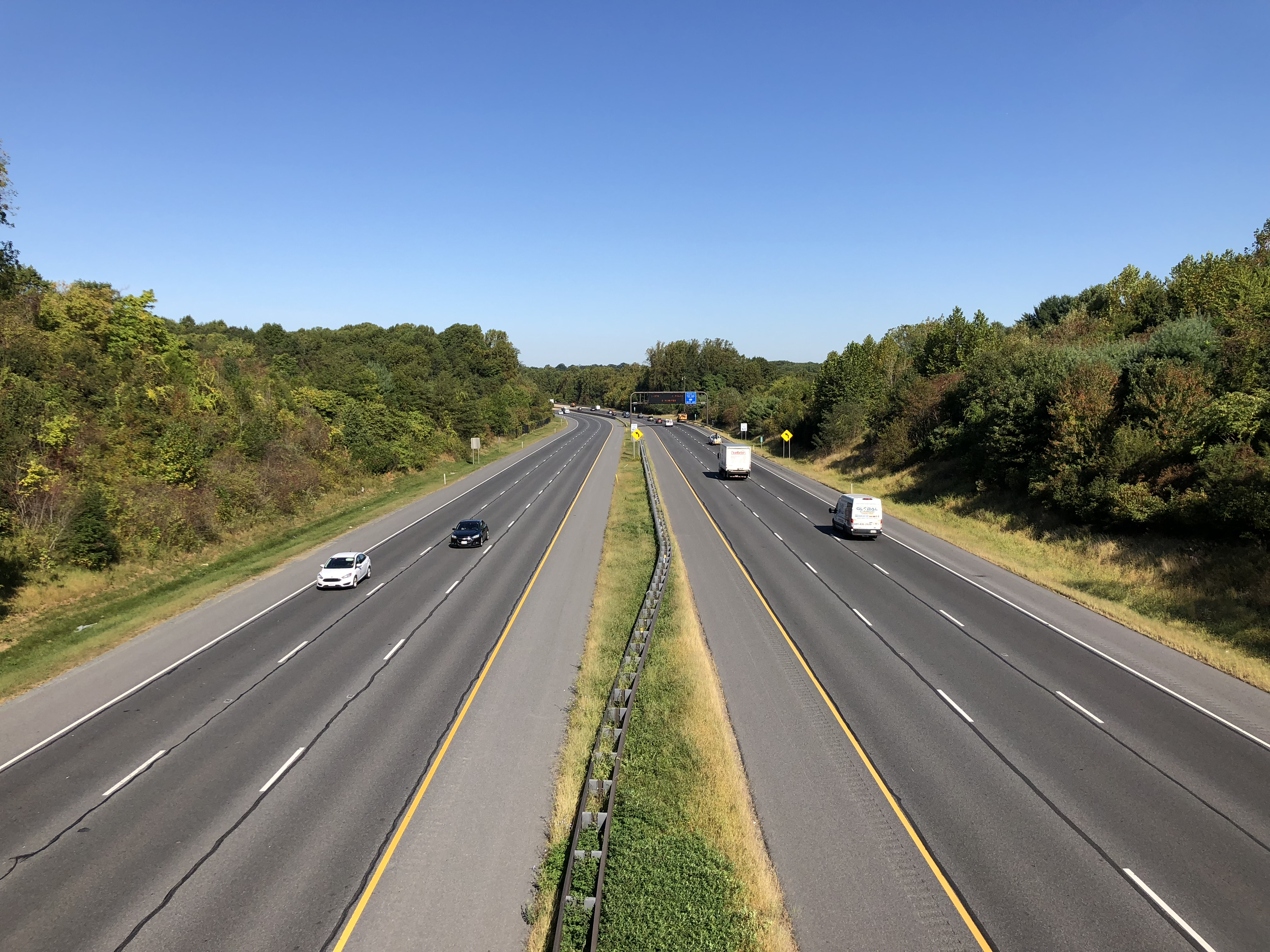
MD 200 westbound in Redland

MD 200 then turns more eastward, running towards North Branch Stream Valley Park and passing over the North Branch Rock Creek and a second stream over a bridge. This is the location of the westbound toll gantry. The route enters the Norbeck area and passes under Emory Lane. Just east of there is where a hybrid cloverleaf interchange with MD 97 (Georgia Avenue) is located. A park and ride lot serving MTA Maryland commuter buses is located southwest of this interchange along MD 97. When the road opened in February 2011, it temporarily came to an end at a traffic light located just east of MD 97 at MD 28 (Norbeck Road).

The route then curves southeastward, passing under MD 28 and Longmead Crossing Drive, running parallel to Wintergate Drive/Park Vista Drive. MD 200 then curves slightly more eastward toward Aspen Hill, where the freeway intersects MD 182 (Layhill Road), shortly after entering the Northwest Branch Recreational Park. The route travels through the park for a stretch, bridging the Northwest Branch Anacostia River three times (the second bridge also carries MD 200 over Bonifant Road), exits the park, and then turns eastward, passing under Notley Road. MD 200 then turns slightly to the northeast near Colesville and meets MD 650 at a single-point urban interchange.

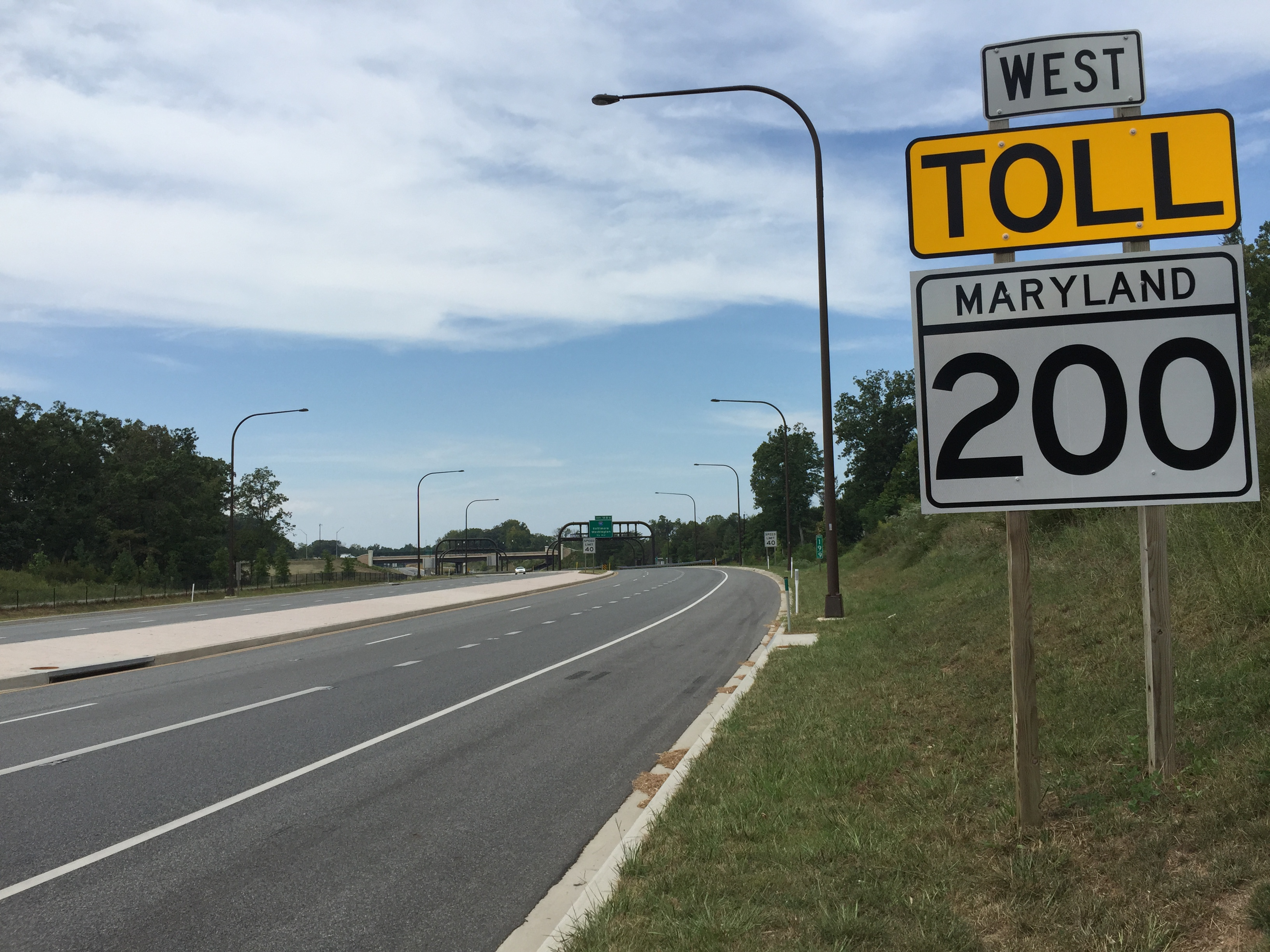
View west from the east end of MD 200 at US 1 in Laurel

MD 200 then continues eastward, passes through Upper Paint Branch Park and bridges several creeks, including the namesake Paint Branch, and passes between several neighborhoods upon exiting the park. The route then passes under Old Columbia Pike with no access to this local road. Just beyond, MD 200 reaches a large interchange with US 29, combining cloverleaf and stack elements. This interchange also adds connections to Fairland Road with both MD 200 and US 29. The route continues eastward, featuring a partial interchange with Briggs Chaney Road (westbound exit and eastbound entrance), and then, just after crossing the border into Prince George's County, it passes over the Little Paint Branch just south of the Fairland Recreational Park. The route then passes under Old Gunpowder Road.

The route then enters Calverton, where the expansive interchange with I-95 is located. The interchange, marked as Exit 31 on I-95, is mostly a cloverleaf hybrid, and features several collector-distributor roads built along I-95, stretching from Old Gunpowder Road south of the interchange to MD 198 north of it. The community of Konterra is planned for construction near this interchange.

Beyond I-95, MD 200 narrows to four lanes. MD 200 curves sharply, first to the south then to the east, and meets a diamond-interchange providing access to Konterra Drive (MD 206). MD 200 then turns gradually to the southeast and ends at a continuous flow intersection at US 1 (Baltimore Avenue) in Laurel.

MD 200 is a part of the main National Highway System for its entire length.

== Tolls ==
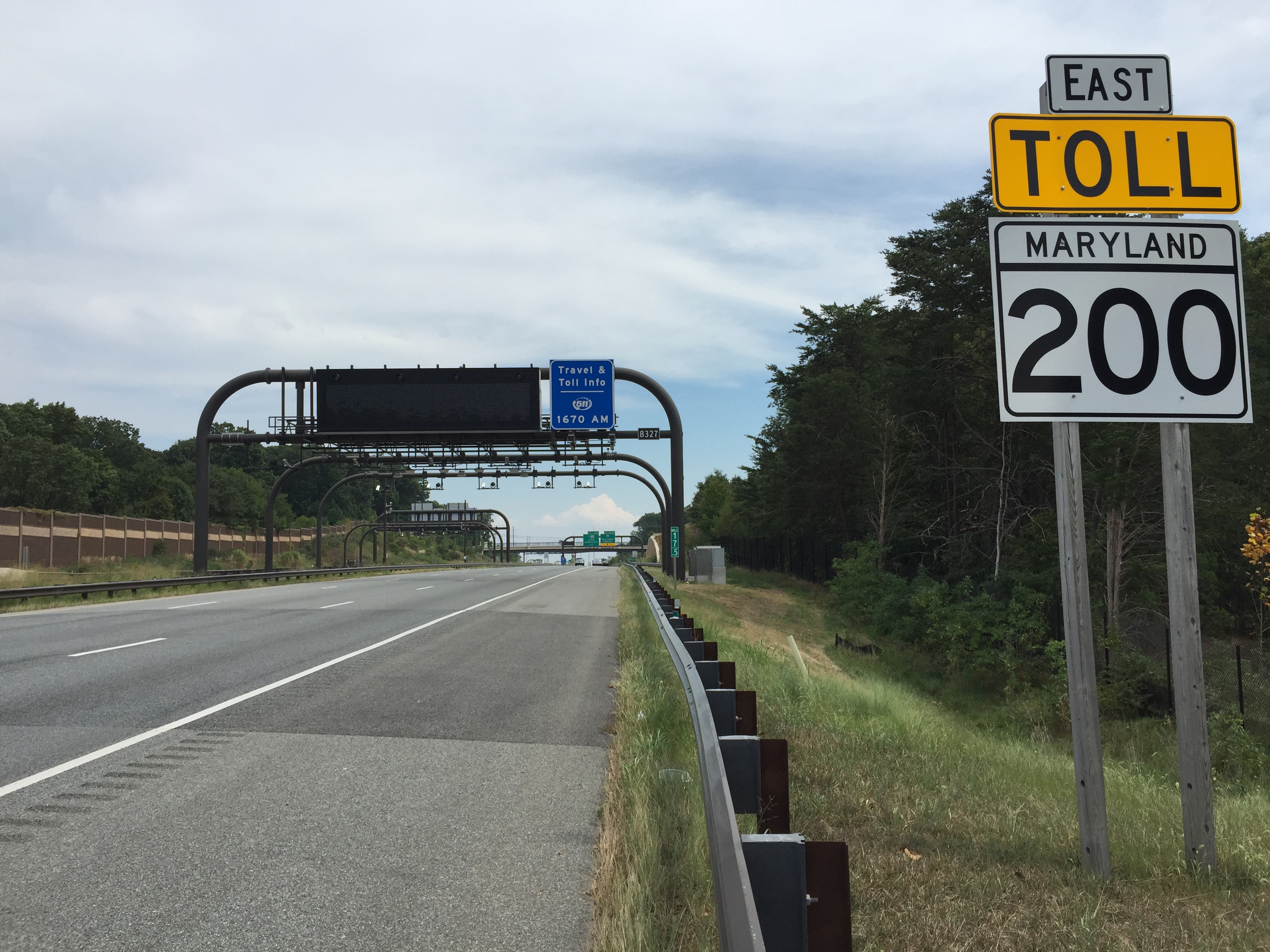
Toll gantry along eastbound MD 200 between US 29 and I-95 in Calverton

The Intercounty Connector uses all-electronic tolling, with tolls payable through E-ZPass or Video Tolling, which uses automatic license plate recognition. ICC users without E-ZPass are mailed a bill to pay the toll along with a 50% surcharge for non-E-ZPass use (minimum of $1). The tolls along the full length of the road (between I-370 and I-95) vary by time of day, ranging from $1.60 overnight to $3.20 in off-peak daytime, and $4 at rush hour (for E-ZPass users; for others toll rates will be approximately 50% higher). Tolls were waived along the road between February 23 and March 7, 2011, and again between November 22 and December 4, 2011.

== History ==
=== Washington Outer Beltway ===
The Intercounty Connector can be traced to plans developed in the 1950s for the proposed 122-mile (196 km) Washington Outer Beltway. The original Outer Beltway had been planned to pass south of the corporate limits of the City of Rockville. The original proposed routing was south and east of the current alignment. The new route was motivated in part by a desire to move the routing of the proposed bridge over the Potomac River upstream from the area of River Bend to Watkins Island. Virginia residents and the United States Department of the Interior objected to the proposed bridge over the Potomac River because they wanted to create state and federal parks along the river in order to protect sugar maple trees, vegetation, and bald eagles. Because of these concerns, the Maryland State Roads Commission moved the proposed Outer Beltway to a route north of Rockville and eliminated a new bridge crossing the Potomac River.

The Montgomery County Planning Board accepted the state's newly proposed route in 1970, but the Montgomery County Council rejected it, and Prince George's County and Virginia dropped it from their plans. In 1975, the National Capital Region Transportation Planning Board of the Metropolitan Washington Council of Governments endorsed a request from the State Highway Administration "for federal support of a $1.1 million planning and engineering study of the first 8-mile [13 km] segment of the road", which was to "run from the Baltimore-Washington Parkway near Beltsville westward to a point near Interstate Rte 70S at Gaithersburg." By 1976, Maryland's Secretary of Transportation no longer supported state financial support of the Outer Beltway, although Montgomery County still supported it in concept.

=== Initial Intercounty Connector plan ===
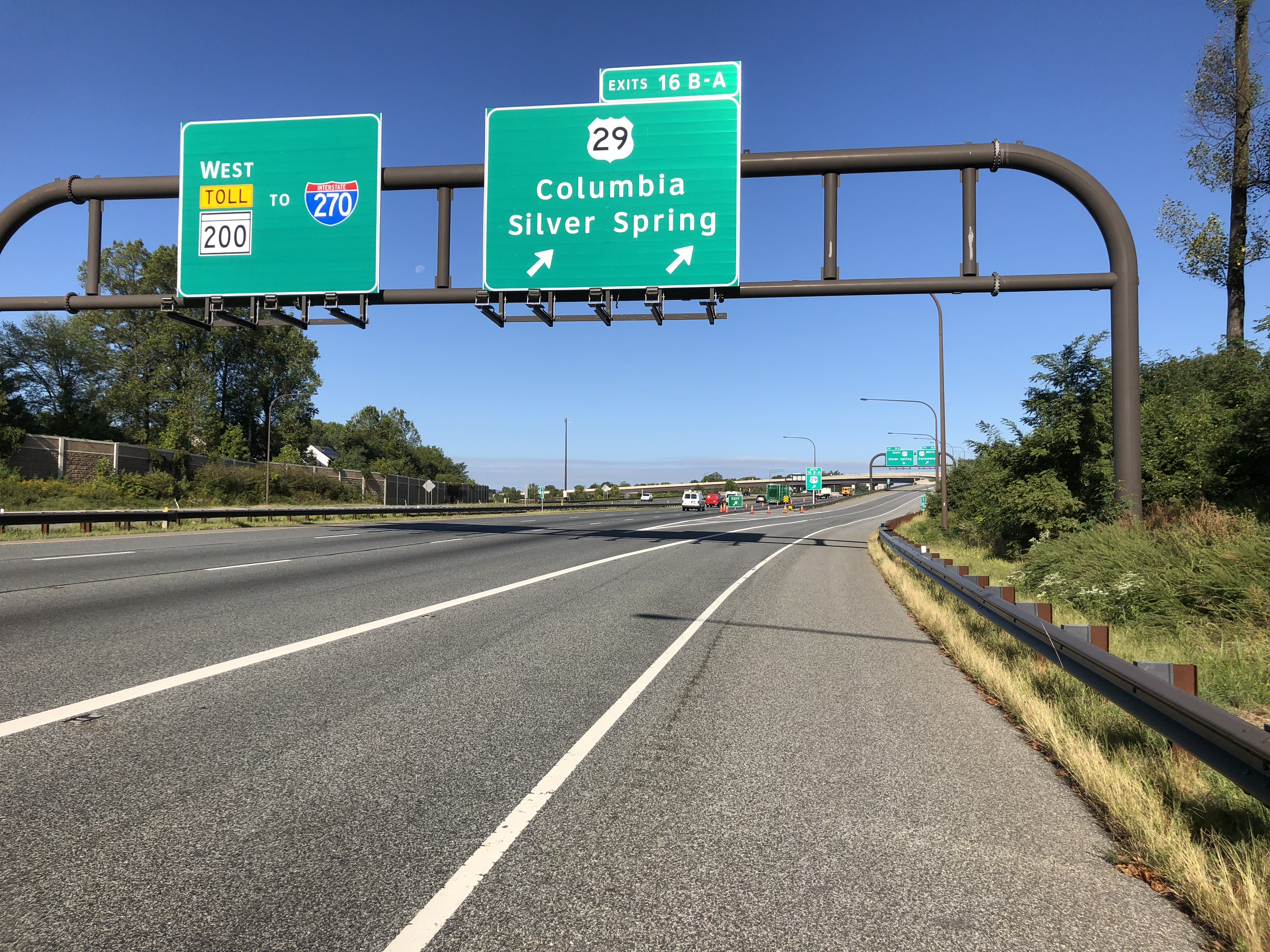
MD 200 westbound at US 29 in Fairland

In 1980, the state of Maryland dropped the Washington Outer Beltway from its plans except for the Intercounty Connector. Meanwhile, the State Highway Administration was studying constructing a 22-mile (35 km) Intercounty Connector with a 10-mile (16 km) spur called the Rockville Facility.

After six days of public workshops, the Maryland State Highway Administration released its first report about the Intercounty Connector and the Rockville Facility in January 1980. The majority of participants supported the highway, although almost everyone said they would prefer building more east–west public transportation instead.

In 1983, the federal National Capital Planning Commission formally requested that the eastern end of the Intercounty Connector be shortened by four miles (6.4 km) so that the eastern terminus of the road would be at I-95 rather than the Baltimore–Washington Parkway. In 1984, Maryland Secretary of Transportation Lowell K. Bridwell designated land in Montgomery and Prince George's counties as the future site of the Intercounty Connector so that the right-of-way would be preserved, even though Montgomery County Executive Charles W. Gilchrist had voiced very critical comments about the Intercounty Connector as it was envisioned in 1983—at least in part because he felt that construction of the ICC by the year 2000 was "infeasible", and advocated construction of a "shorter and less-costly" east–west highway instead.

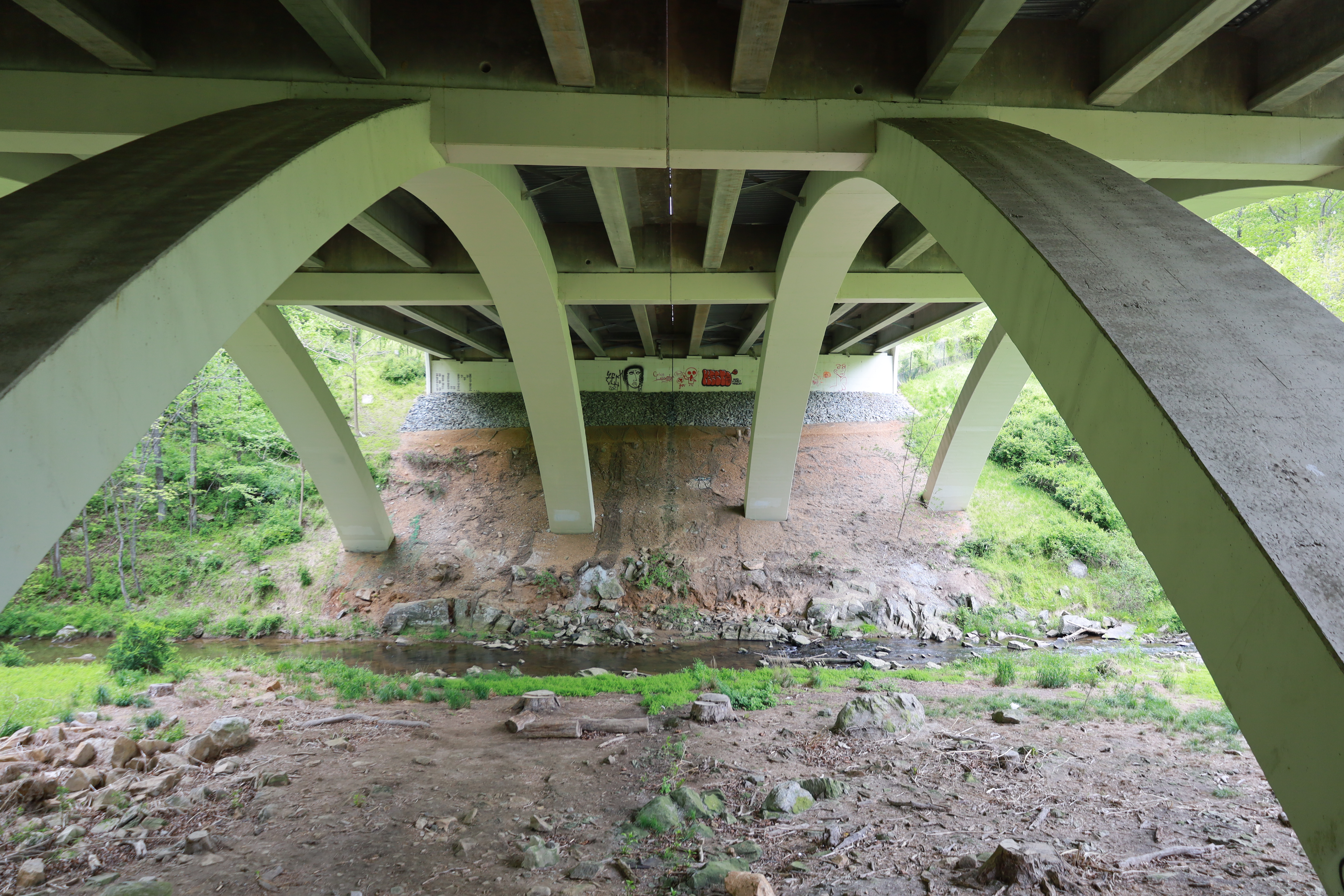
MD 200 crosses Rock Creek and the Upper Rock Creek Trail via an arch bridge

Prior to Governor Parris N. Glendening declaring the Intercounty Connector "dead" before leaving office in January 2003, two environmental impact studies had been conducted, the first being a draft document in 1983. In 1977, the Patuxent Wildlife Research Center expressed concerns about the impact that the ICC would have on its experiments. An initial environmental study was undertaken in the late 1970s, and extended into the 1980s, with a draft published in 1983. A second study was initiated around 1992, and a draft environmental impact statement was issued in 1997. The final environmental impact statement was drafted by 1989 but did not receive federal approval, leading to the abandonment of the study until a new study began in 1992; the 1992–1997 study pointed to a similar conclusion, though it was never completed. By 1997, millions of dollars had been spent on planning and preliminary engineering, but the only segments of the road that had been built were I-370 between I-270 and the Shady Grove Metrorail station on WMATA's Red Line.

=== Glendening rejects Transportation Solutions Group recommendations ===
After the 1997 Intercounty Connector Draft Environmental Impact Statement process was put on hold by Governor Glendening, much controversy resulted between groups and persons in favor of the ICC and those opposed. The Intercounty Counnector became a political issue in 1998, an election year in Maryland. A blue-ribbon committee entitled the Transportation Solutions Group was formed in 1998 to tell the Governor's Smart Growth Sub-Cabinet about intermodal transportation that complied with state and regional goals. The Transportation Solutions Group, chaired by Thomas B. Deen, former executive director of the Transportation Research Board, met at a series of meetings over about 14 months in 1998 and 1999. Policy suggestions and recommendations made by the Transportation Solutions Group included that most of the group supports "providing high-speed bus transit, HOV and SOV access through a new east-west, value priced, limited-access parkway", with some opposition to the parkway and that the group had a divided opinion on a freeway, with most supporting it. The Transportation Solutions Group had initially voted to oppose the Intercounty Connector on its master planned route, but voted 10 in favor and 4 opposed in February 1999 to endorse a highway alternative with the condition that single-occupant vehicles be charged a toll. At its final meeting in June 1999, the Transportation Solutions Group held a public hearing in College Park and voted 12 to 4 in favor of a "parkway-like highway from I-270 to I-95, following the general path of the ICC."

The Transportation Solutions Group also made a recommendation that a system of high-occupancy toll lanes (with variable pricing) be implemented on major freeways of the region, including the Intercounty Connector, I-95, the Capital Beltway, I-270 and US 50.

On September 22, 1999, Glendening chose to reject the Transportation Solutions Group recommendation, asserting that the project was "wrong", "inconsistent with Smart Growth doctrine", and an "environmental disaster". The Washington Post quoted Glendening quoted as saying, "It is a proposal that has fractured our communities. It has pitted neighbor against neighbor. And it has created political gridlock while traffic gridlock has only worsened."

Even though Glendening chose to ignore the Transportation Solutions Group's primary recommendation, its work was not entirely in vain, as its efforts were to be cited prominently some years later in the Intercounty Connector's Final Environmental Impact Statement . The concept of a regionwide network of HOT lanes (to be called "variably priced highway lanes") was further developed by the Transportation Planning Board, and a regional network (including the Intercounty Connector) was described in a report published in February 2008.

After rejecting the Intercounty Connector, Glendening and opponents of the Intercounty Connector then examined the possibility of selling its right-of-way, but proponents of the Intercounty Connector would have been able to stop such a sale at the Board of Public Works, which must approve transactions involving the sale of state-owned real estate.

=== Montgomery County steps in ===
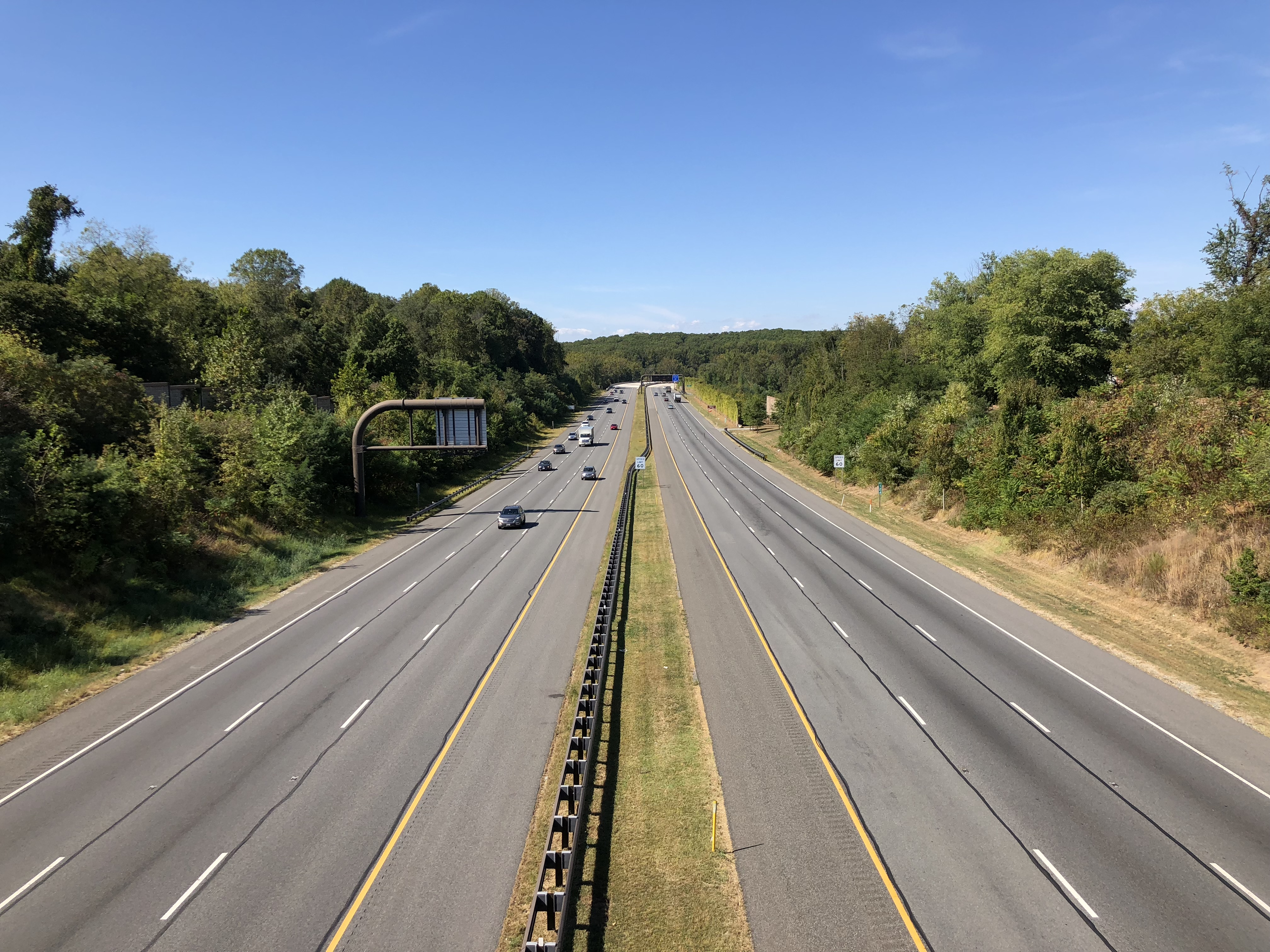
MD 200 westbound in Colesville

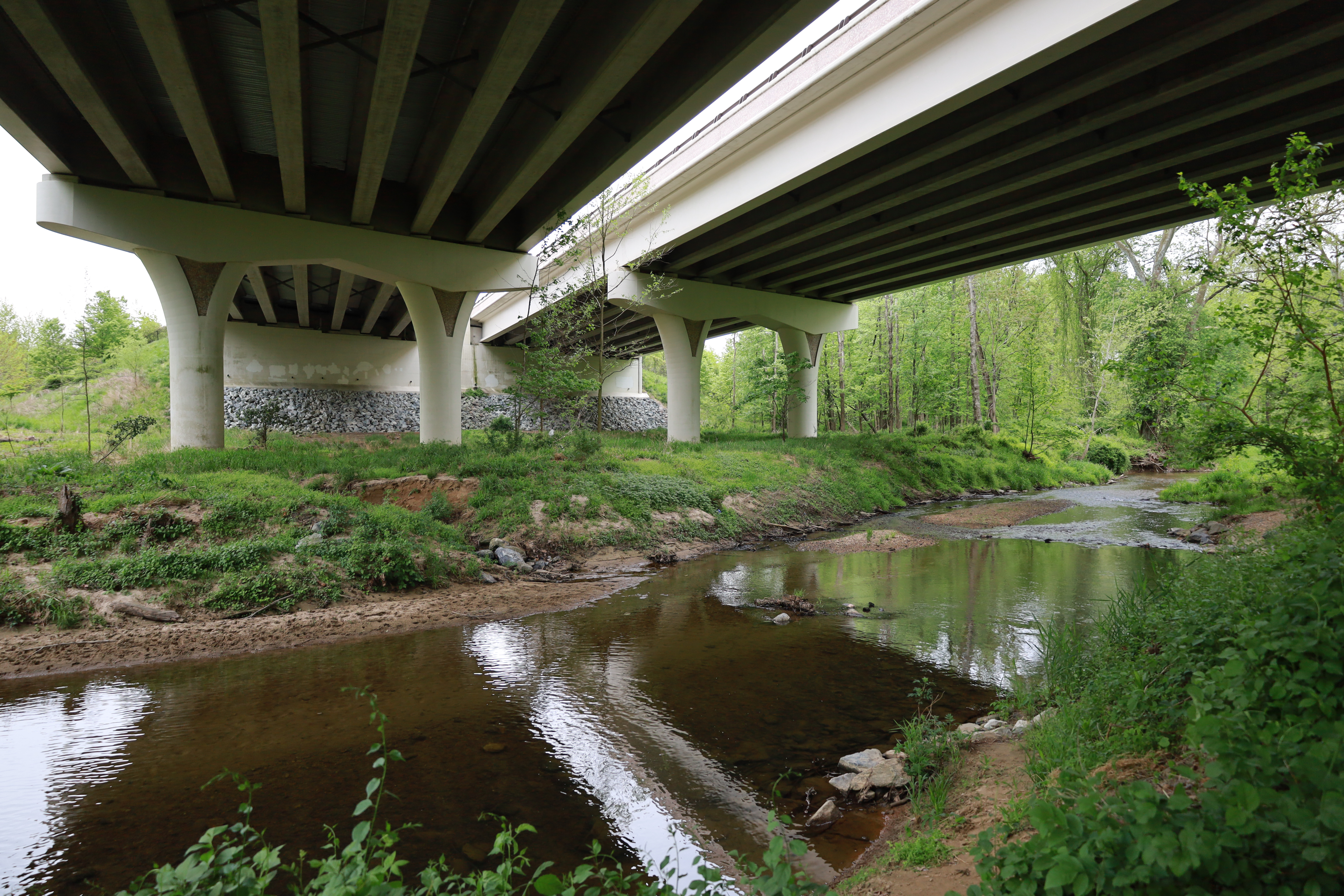
The upstreammost of three crossings of the Northwest Branch Anacostia River

In 1999, staff to the Montgomery County Planning Board said that the Intercounty Connector could be removed from master plans, but that such an effort would take "six or seven years" to accomplish. In November 1999, the Montgomery County Council discussed removing the Intercounty Connector from master plans, and while five of the nine members were opposed to the Intercounty Connector, the District 4 member, Marilyn Praisner, declined to agree to removal of the master-planned route, for fear that the so-called Northern Alignment (Corridor 2 in the 2005 Draft Environmental Impact Statement) would become a de facto Intercounty Connector in the future. The effort by Montgomery County politicians to remove the Intercounty Connector from its plans irritated powerful members of the Maryland General Assembly (notably Senate President Thomas V. "Mike" Miller), who discussed legislative measures that could be taken in the General Assembly to thwart such a move. In February 2000, an agreement between Montgomery County's politicians and members of the General Assembly reached an agreement "memorialized in two letters but not cast in stone" that the "... Council agreed not to take any action to kill the ICC during the next three years."

In 2000, Montgomery County Planning Board established the Transportation Policy Report and then the more-inclusive Transportation Policy Report II Task Force "... in an effort to establish a framework for future Master Plans and to help set priorities for future infrastructure." The Transportation Policy Report II Task Force had 33 members, including persons in favor of the Intercounty Connector and those opposed. The Transportation Policy Report II Task Force listed the Intercounty Connector in its recommended network, following a caveat that "If they are found feasible and ultimately judged desirable to implement, the priority of implementation could be established at that time. When the Montgomery County Council was briefed on the report, discussions quickly shifted to the Intercounty Connector and the controversy associated with it. The Intercounty Connector's Final Environmental Impact Statement makes specific reference to the work done by the Transportation Policy Report II Task Force.

The Maryland State Senate, in its 2002 session, passed Senate Joint Resolution 8, which asked Glendening to restart the Intercounty Connector Environmental Impact Statement that had been put on hold in 1997. The Maryland House of Delegates passed an accompanying resolution, House Joint Resolution 10 with essentially similar provisions. The Intercounty Connector study was not to be restarted until Glendening left office at the end of 2002.

=== Revival ===
Logo used for the Intercounty Connector for public relations

In 2003, Governor Ehrlich followed through with his campaign promise to resurrect the Intercounty Connector study, and he was allowed a fast-track review process by the United States Secretary of Transportation, Norman Mineta. In addition to the election of Ehrlich, the Montgomery County Council that was seated at the end of 2002 had a 6–3 majority of members in favor of the project. Prior to the 2002 election, a majority had been skeptical, if not outright opposed, to the project. The Montgomery County Council and County Executive Douglas M. Duncan issued a resolution endorsing the Intercounty Connector in December 2002.

On April 21, 2004, the Transportation Planning Board voted to include the Intercounty Connector in future networks of the Washington region's transportation system for purposes of forecasting changes in air quality. On November 17, 2004, the Transportation Planning Board endorsed regional transportation plans which included the Intercounty Connector, determining that the proposed plans met air quality goals and that funding for the project was adequate.

On July 11, 2005, Governor Ehrlich announced the state's preference to build the Intercounty Connector along Corridor 1. Corridor 1 (approximately 80% of which is the Master Plan Alignment) has been on the books for decades; Corridor 2, also known as the Northern Alignment, was designed to reduce Corridor 1's impact on the environment. While the EPA gave Corridor 2 a higher environmental rating, it was eventually rejected by the state due to the increased number of homes and businesses that would have to be removed for its construction, because of negative environmental impacts on the Washington Suburban Sanitary Commission's Rocky Gorge Reservoir on the Patuxent River (which is a source of drinking water for much of the WSSC service area), and because it was not consistent with several approved and adopted Maryland-National Capital Park and Planning Commission master plans in Montgomery and Prince George's Counties.

On August 31, 2005, the Board of Public Works gave its approval to the Corridor 1 alternative, which allowed state funding of the project in accordance with Maryland's provisions (established by statute) for funding a "growth-related project" that is not entirely within Priority Funding Areas.

In December 2005, controversy arose over the Intercounty Connector's proposed toll rate. At a proposed 17 cents per mile (11 ¢/km), an end-to-end driver would have to pay about $6 a day for a round-trip (about $1,500 per year).

On May 30, 2006, the Federal Highway Administration gave approval to the Corridor 1 plan, meaning that Maryland had satisfied "all environmental, economic and community requirements and that it can build the highway". The Baltimore Business Journal wrote, "Federal approval for the $2.4 billion connector came after Ehrlich made a direct request to President George W. Bush, who named the Intercounty Connector as one of his priority projects. The president's direct attention prompted federal resource agencies to give the project a more timely environmental review."

As approved, the Intercounty Connector would be 18 miles (29 km) long, running from I-370 in Gaithersburg to I-95 in Beltsville. It would be a controlled access toll-highway with eight interchanges, and two park-and-ride lots would be built as well. The project included $370 million for mitigation and environmental stewardship activities in order to address the impact of communities, wetlands, streams, wildlife, forests, air quality, historic resources, and parklands.

=== Construction ===
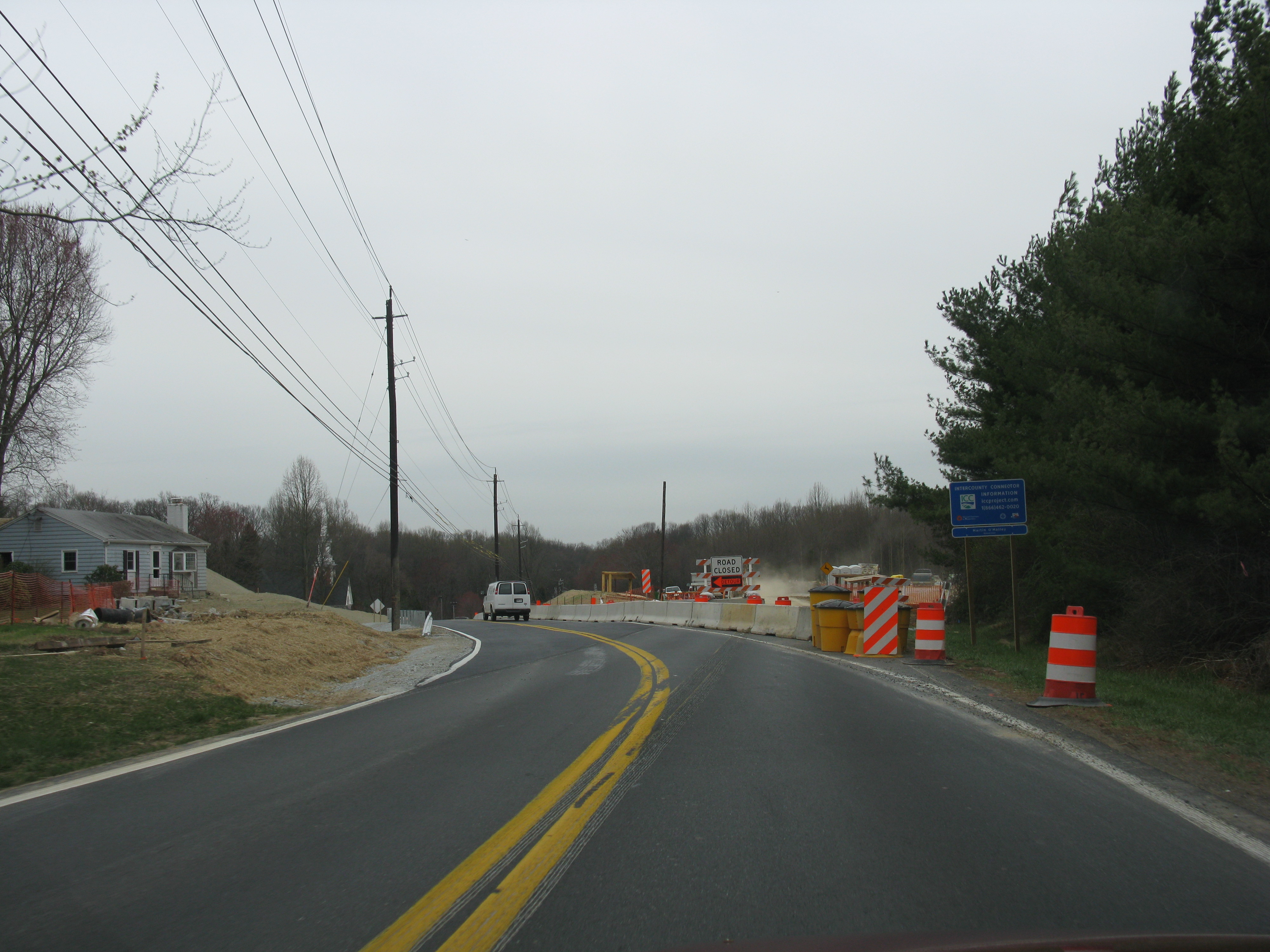
Construction of MD 200 in Redland

The SHA constructed the ICC using separate design-build contracts for five phases.

- A. I-270/I-370 to east of MD 97
- B. East of MD 97 to west of US 29
- C. West of US 29 to east of I-95 interchange, and I-95 collector/distributor road improvements along I-95 from MD 212 to just north of the ICC
- D. Collector/distributor road improvements along I-95 from just north of the ICC to north of MD 198, including a new exit on the interstate at Konterra Drive
- E. East of I-95 interchange to US 1

The first of the five contracts was awarded on March 27, 2007. The contract, worth $478.7 million, was awarded to Intercounty Constructors, a joint venture of Granite Construction Company, Corman Construction Inc. and G.A. & F.C. Wagman, Inc. Construction on the seven-mile (11 km) section between I-370 and MD 97 began in November 2007. Contracts for three other phases are completed and the fifth phase involving collector-distributor lanes along I-95 has been completed.

Requests for statements of qualification were issued for Phase A in December 2005, for Phase D in August 2006, and for Phase B in August 2007.

The selection of the second of the five contracts was announced on November 20, 2007. The contract, worth $513.9 million, was awarded to IC3, a joint venture of Shirley Contracting Company, LLC; Clark Construction Group, LLC; Guy F. Atkinson Construction, LLC; Facchina Construction Company, Inc. and Trumbull Corporation. This work includes the ICC from a point west of US 29 to I-95, and interchanges with those routes.

On September 4, 2008, The Washington Post reported that the Contract B construction contract had been awarded on July 22, 2008, to a joint venture of Kiewit, Corman Construction, and G.A. & F.C. Wagman, at a total cost of about $559.7 million—reportedly 22% higher than previous estimates. The Post story went on to say that a protest of this contract award was filed on July 30, 2008, by a joint venture that was not selected, though the bid price from the rejected group was lower. This protest may have delayed the start of construction on Contract B. On October 15, 2008, the Post reported that the protest was denied by state procurement officer Robert P. Gay and that the losing proposer would file an appeal with the Maryland State Board of Contract Appeals.

On September 12, 2008, the Post reported that Contract D ran into funding issues which had delayed its construction. Contract D is associated with the proposed new interchange of I-95 and Contee Road (not part of the ICC). SHA Former Administrator Neil J. Pedersen stated that the "service roads can be delayed until the I-95 interchange has been built at Contee Road."

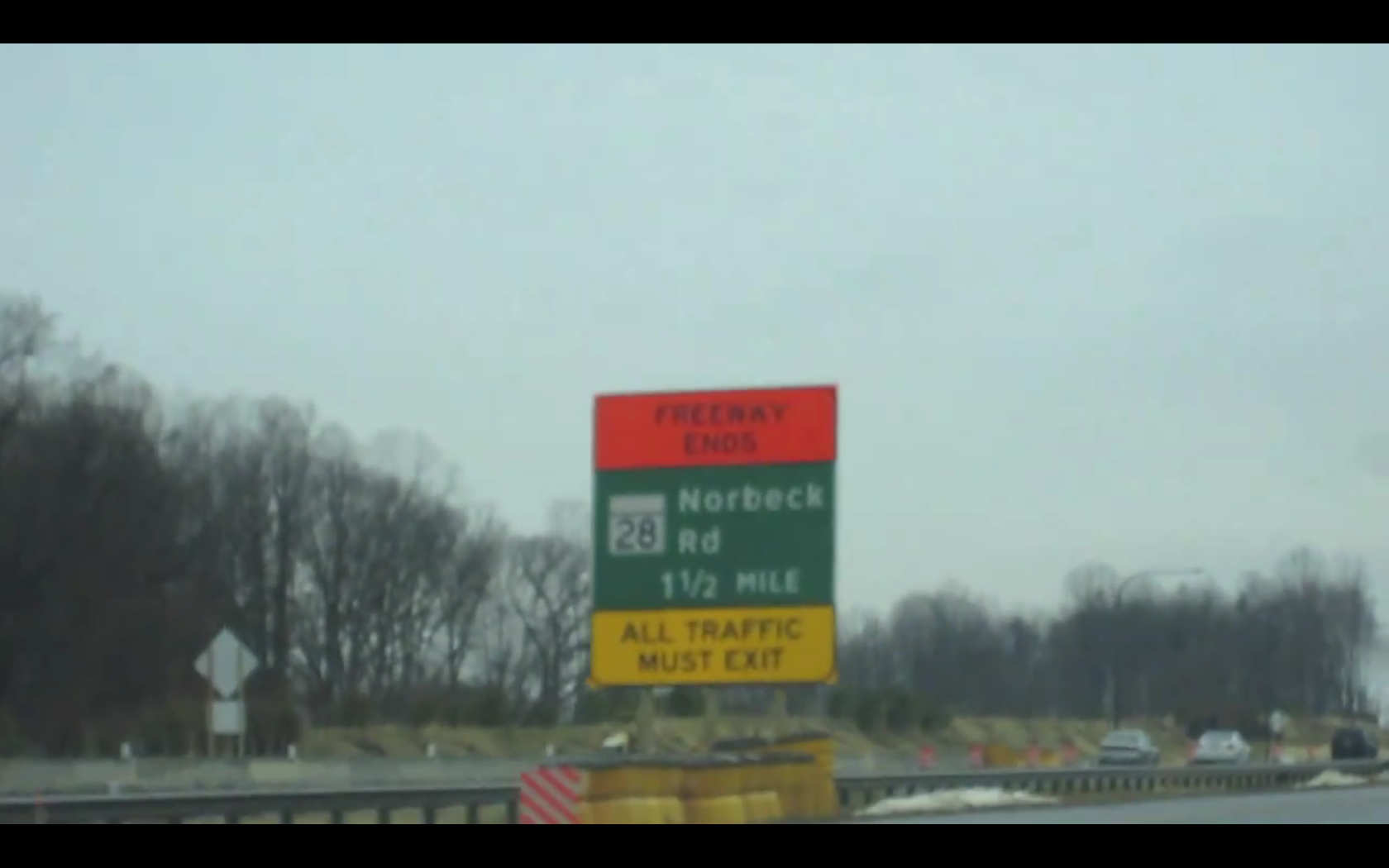
Sign indicating that MD 200 ended at MD 28 (Norbeck Road)—since November 22, 2011, this is no longer the case

The first segment opened on February 23, 2011, ahead of its projected spring 2011 opening. No tolls were charged on the date of opening to March 6, 2011. On the opening morning, over 10,000 vehicles used the highway, and it went on to draw in 30,000 vehicles per day. During the first week of May, the tollway drew 11,490 vehicles per day, which is much less than the 21,000 projected (though by 2014, this section of highway was averaging almost 40,000 vehicles per day on average). As a result, the state launched a $1.4 million advertising campaign to promote the new highway. The second segment of the highway, from MD 97 to I-95 opened on November 22, 2011. The highway was opened between I-95 and US 1 on November 7, 2014.

=== Funding ===
The $2.56-billion project (in 2007 dollars) was funded from several sources, including $1.23 billion of Maryland Transportation Authority revenue bonds (50%), $0.75 billion of Grant Anticipation Revenue Vehicle bonds (31%), $0.26 billion from the Maryland General Fund (11%); $0.18 billion from the Maryland Transportation Trust Fund (7%); and $0.18 billion from Special Federal Funds (1%).

=== Opposition ===
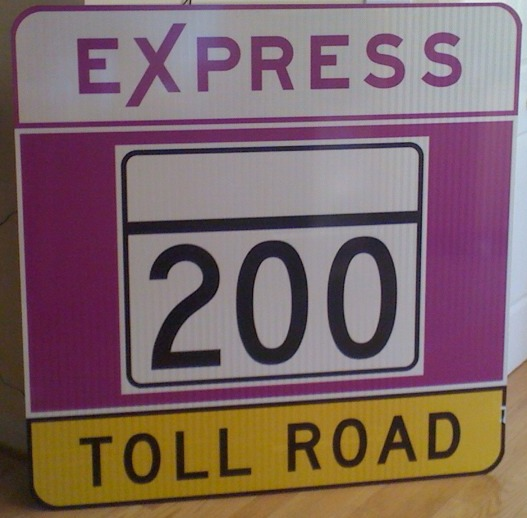
Route Marker for ICC

MD 200 has gained opposition from several groups, including the Maryland General Assembly and the Prince George's County Council. Proponents of the highway have claimed that it will improve the flow of interregional traffic, relieving traffic congestion on local roads. Opponents of the highway have claimed that the road will (with a few limited exceptions) harm significant traffic flow characteristics (such as increasing drive times, congestion, and costs in the form of tolls), will harm the environment (with air, sea and land impacts), and will disrupt established communities through which it passes.

==== Government ====
Members of the Maryland General Assembly stated opposition in the Spring 2008 and Spring 2009 sessions, the 1998 session, and back to 1979, when a bill introduced in the General Assembly by Delegate Robin Ficker proposed to eliminate funding for a study of the ICC and the never-built Rockville Facility highway project. In 1980, a bill proposed by Delegate Idamae Garrott to forbid the Maryland Department of Transportation from even studying the matter of new highways running east and west between Montgomery and Prince George's Counties was tabled by the Montgomery County Delegation.

In the 1998 session, House Bill 817 was introduced to prohibit MDOT from spending funds or granting approvals to the ICC project, and House Bill 905 was intended to stop the operation of a toll highway altogether. Both bills failed to pass. In 2004, House Bill 732 proposed a similar statement to House Bill 817, extended to include the MdTA. The 2007 Special Session saw the offering of House Bill 37 to prevent construction of the road. Both of these bills also failed to pass. In the 2008 session, two bills proposing to cancel or delay the project were introduced—House Bill 1416 and House Bill 1471. House Bill 1471 proposed to eliminate funding for the road, and, if it had passed, would trigger "liquidated damage clauses that would require it to pay the contractors an estimated $80.0 million upon cancellation of the contracts," according to the Fiscal Note prepared by the state's Department of Legislative Services. Both bills failed.

In the 2009 session, a bill proposing to cancel funding for the ICC was pre-filed by Delegate Barbara A. Frush—House Bill 27. This bill had not attracted any co-sponsors nor had it been scheduled for a hearing. A similar bill, Senate Bill 753, was filed in the Maryland Senate by Sen. E. J. Pipkin and others. The Maryland Politics Watch blog opined that Pipkin's co-sponsorship of SB 753 may be related to his possible desire to run again for the U.S. House of Representatives Maryland District 1 seat. Both bills failed in the 2009 session. House Bill 27 received an unfavorable report from the House of Delegates Appropriations Committee on March 28, 2009; and no action was taken on Senate Bill 753 prior to adjournment on April 13, 2009, though a hearing was scheduled on March 18, 2009, before the Senate Budget and Taxation Committee.

The position of the County Council of Prince George's County in opposition to the ICC has been repeatedly cited by opposition groups, and its 2003 resolution on the subject, CR-32-2003, was adopted on June 10, 2003, where it called for alternatives to the road. In 2007, the Prince George's County Council passed resolution CR-59-2007, which repeats much of what was stated in CR-32-2003, including the language endorsing the ICC in Prince George's County.

==== Environmental groups ====
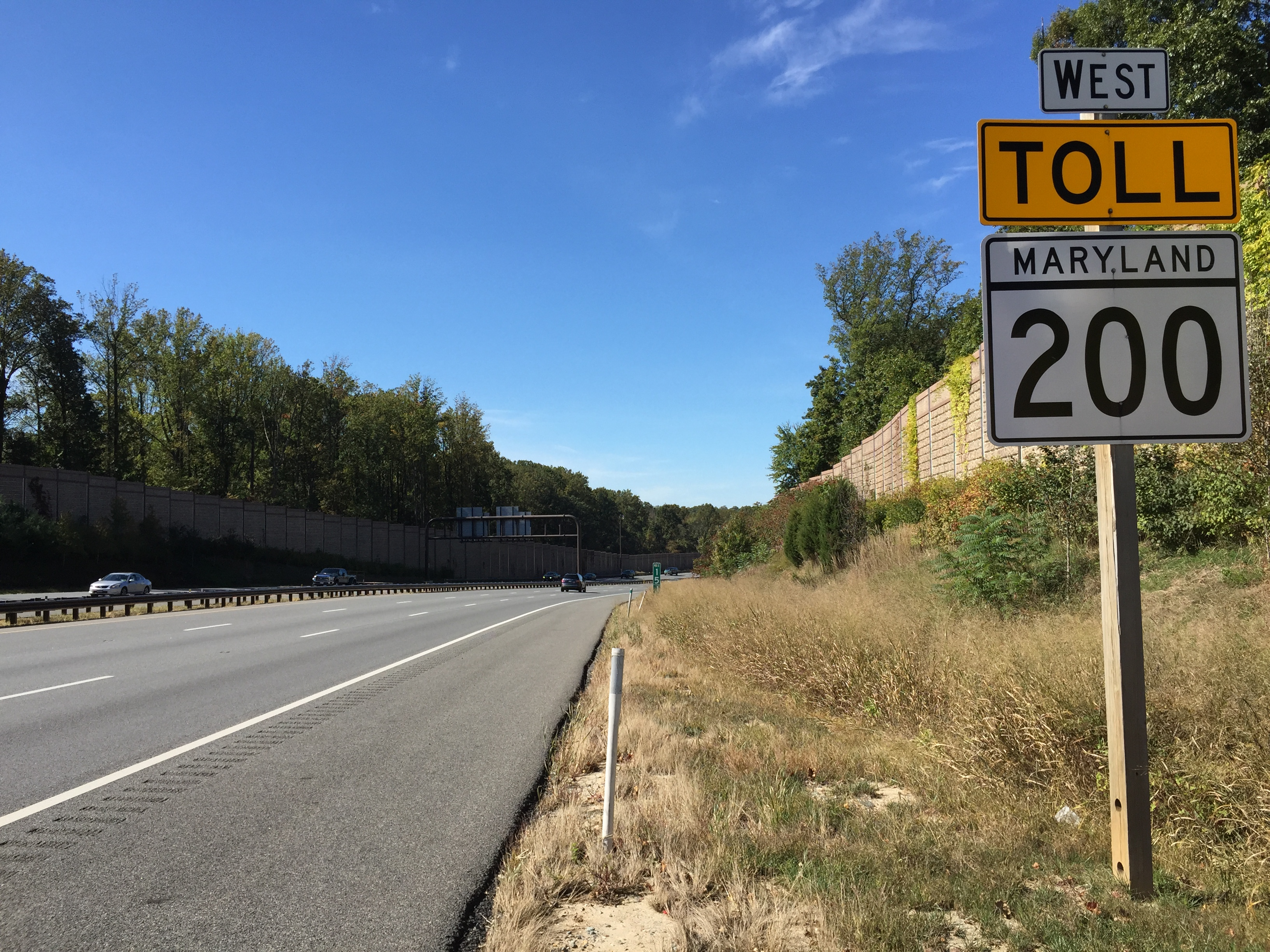
MD 200 westbound past US 29 in Fairland

In November 2006, environmental groups announced that they were preparing to file suit in order to delay or stop the project, and lawsuits aimed at halting construction were filed by environmental groups and affected residents, assisted in part by pro bono legal counsel from the Institute for Public Representation of the Georgetown University Law Center. One of those lawsuits was originally filed in the U.S. District Court for the District of Columbia (possibly as part of a forum shopping effort to avoid having the Fourth Circuit Court of Appeals hear the case on appeal – though the United States Court of Appeals for the District of Columbia Circuit, which would have heard any appeals from the D.C. federal court, had ruled against the Sierra Club and allied groups on similar legal issues in reversing a lower court on a case involving the proposal to reconstruct and widen the Woodrow Wilson Bridge in 1999) but Judge Gladys Kessler of the D.C. federal court ordered the matter transferred to federal court in Maryland on May 17, 2007, and the suits were consolidated. After hearings in October 2007, both lawsuits were dismissed in their entirety on November 8, 2007, by Judge Alexander Williams, Jr. of the U.S. District Court for the District of Maryland in a 105-page memorandum opinion.

The Baltimore Sun described the decision handed down by the court as a "victory for both Governor Martin O'Malley, who backs construction of the road, and a measure of vindication for former Governor Robert L. Ehrlich, who made it the top transportation priority of his administration." After the opinion was released, environmental groups opposed to the ICC stated that they would "consider their legal options before deciding whether to continue their battle" and some homeowners near the selected route expressed disagreement with the ruling of the court. On January 7, 2008, it was announced that the Environmental Defense Fund and the Sierra Club would appeal Judge Williams' decision to the United States Court of Appeals for the Fourth Circuit in Richmond, Virginia. In April 2008, persons and groups opposed to the ICC, including the Shady Grove Woods Homeowners Association, held an "Irish wake" to draw attention to the impact of the ICC. The Derwood event was attended by approximately 100 people, all of whom wore green t-shirts to show their support for the trees. The event's planners also named the event "O'Malley's March" after Governor Martin O'Malley's former rock band in the hopes that this would encourage him to cancel the project. An op-ed in The Diamondback was printed which raised objections to the ICC.

In June 2004, protests against the ICC were held at Dr. Charles R. Drew Elementary School in Silver Spring, where the State Highway Administration was simultaneously holding a public ICC workshop. This event was more heavily attended than the Derwood event and featured multiple speeches by people opposing the highway, which included Phil Andrews, a Montgomery County Council member. The participants claimed that ICC construction should be halted because of air pollution impacts on pupils at the school; however, it was clear that Governor O'Malley had no plans to do so. In August 2008, The Baltimore Sun published a letter to the editor from the executive director of the Coalition for Smarter Growth calling on the Maryland Department of Transportation to "cancel the ICC." In September 2008, The Sun's columnist Dan Rodricks wrote an anti-ICC opinion piece asserting that the ICC was the "Intercounty Anachronism". Rodricks' column was first rebutted by a letter to the editor by Montgomery County Councilmember Nancy Floreen (D-At Large) and then in a longer op-ed by SHA Administrator Neil Pedersen. Also in September 2008, The Gazette published an op-ed by state delegate Heather Mizeur (D-District 20) suggesting that the ICC be canceled. The Mizeur op-ed was rebutted in a response (also published by The Gazette) by Neil Pedersen in October 2008.

In November 2008, it was announced that the Environmental Defense Fund had dropped its appeal with the Fourth Circuit of the decision handed down by Judge Williams of the U.S. District Court for Maryland about a year earlier. In exchange for dropping the suit, the State Highway Administration agreed to fund new emissions-reduction technology used by public school buses in Montgomery County; and the SHA will also "sponsor a three-year study that involves installing air quality monitors along a major highway selected for its similar characteristics to the ICC and I-95." Press releases were issued by the State Highway Administration and Environmental Defense Fund discussing the details of the legal settlement.

=== Environmental mitigation ===
A major component of the ICC is environmental mitigation and aesthetics. In addition to work taking place near and in the right-of-way of the ICC, there are over 50 "off-site environmental and community improvement projects" that will be funded as part of the ICC engineering and construction budget.

In a letter to the editor of The Baltimore Sun, David Marks, a former official with the Maryland Department of Transportation, wrote that the SHA project team "...had the foresight to require substantial environmental improvements as part of the project, and they insisted on broad public input..."

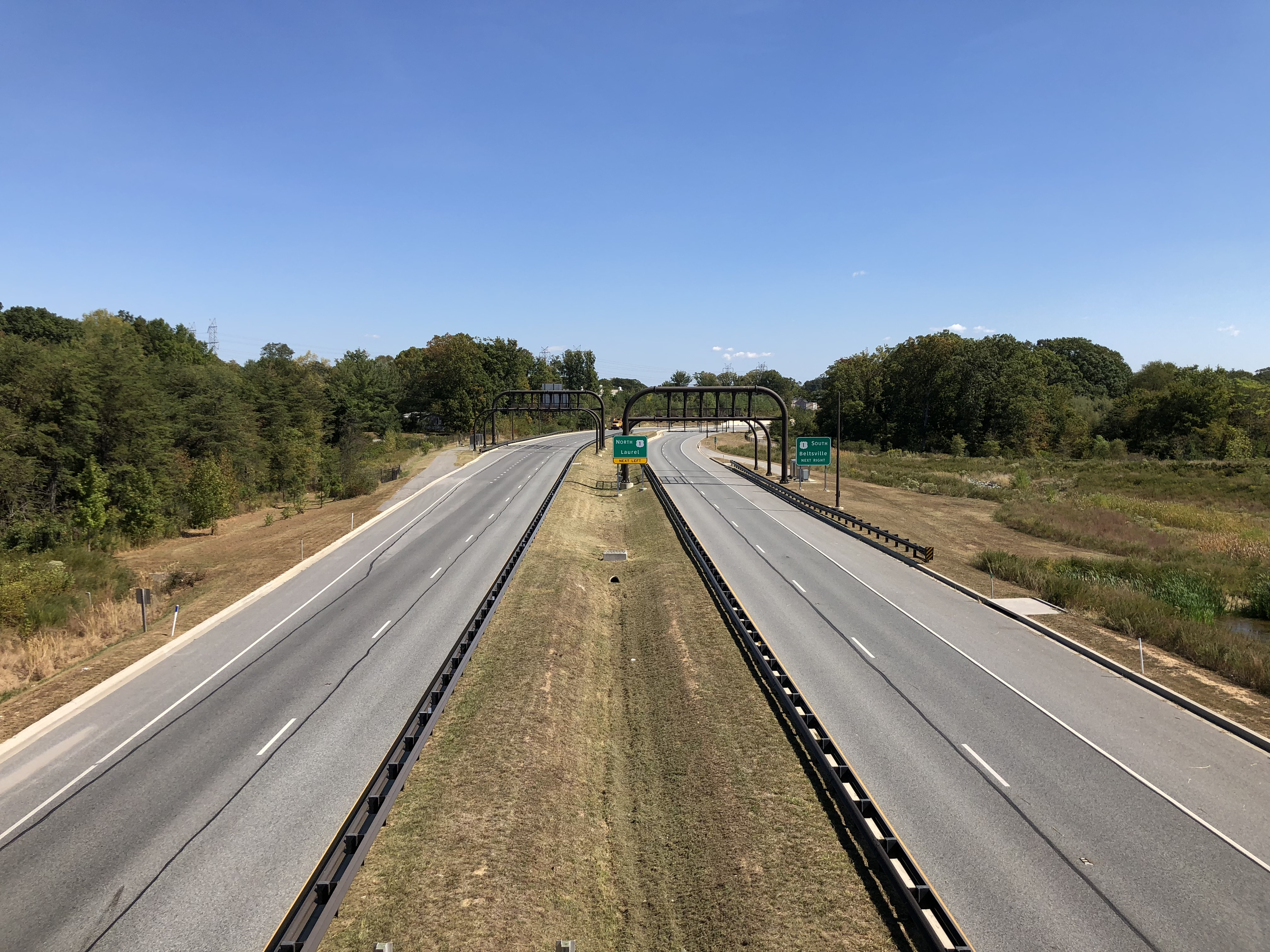
MD 200 eastbound past MD 206 in Konterra

One component of the mitigation is the replacement of parkland taken for the ICC with new land. Replacement lands intended to compensate for these losses include a large parcel of land in the Boyds area of Montgomery County owned by the Eugene B. Casey Foundation. However, the trustees of the Casey Foundation did not agree to the purchase of this parcel, so the State Highway Administration acquired the land by condemnation and the matter was reported as resolved in June 2008. In July 2008, controversy was reported on a similar subject. A 118-acre (0.48 km^{2}) parcel of land near the intersection of MD 198 and Peach Orchard Road which had been condemned by the SHA in 1997 for possible use as the so-called Northern Alignment (Corridor 2) was conveyed to the Maryland-National Capital Park and Planning Commission to compensate for parkland which will be taken by the ICC. The former owner, Winchester Homes, filed a lawsuit contending that the SHA must offer to sell this land back to Winchester, and in May 2008, Judge S. Michael Pincus of the Montgomery County Circuit Court ruled that "the SHA was contractually obligated to offer Winchester Homes the chance to buy back the property." It was further reported that the state filed an appeal in June 2008.

In the February 2008 edition of the Successes in Stewardship newsletter, the Federal Highway Administration stated:

Since environmental impacts were the major barrier to prior ICC planning efforts, the third EIS team redefined the project-development approach to explicitly include environmental stewardship as part of the project's stated purpose and need. In order to fulfill the ICC's stated purpose "to help restore the natural, human, and cultural environments in the project area from the adverse effects of past development," lead-agency staff used context-sensitive design approaches to minimize or altogether avoid adverse impacts to wetlands and streams in the development of project alternatives.

At least one section of the ICC was re-routed from the master-planned route to reduce environmental impact, though the re-routing led to additional residences having to be condemned as a result.

Eastern box turtles (Terrapene carolina carolina) that were in the path of the ICC were located with the aid of dogs trained to find them by scent and were moved to other locations in Montgomery County near Boyds and Brookeville.

In a letter to the editor of The Gazette, SHA Administrator Neil Pedersen enumerated a list of environmental mitigation and community enhancements that SHA is funding as part of constructing the ICC.

The ICC is likely to force changes to the 14th hole of the Cross Creek Golf Club, which straddles the border between Montgomery County and Prince George's County. However, it was reported that the 14th hole was surveyed incorrectly, and part of it was mistakenly located on land set aside for the ICC.

In January 2009, it was reported that Eyes of Paint Branch (a group that has opposed the ICC) had recently demanded of the SHA that the contractors working to build the ICC comply with Montgomery County's regulations for the Upper Paint Branch Special Protection Area, which the State of Maryland has no legal obligation to follow.

Construction of the ICC has forced the National Capital Trolley Museum to relocate its car barns, shops, visitors center, and part of its track a short distance to the north. In 2006, the museum's development director made a public plea for relocation help and coordination in a Washington Post op-ed column. The museum suspended operations for relocation in December 2008 and resumed trolley rides in January 2010. In August 2009, the SHA held a public forum at the new and relocated trolley museum to describe the environmental mitigation aspects of the ongoing ICC construction project.

A major environmental concern along the entire ICC project is the impact of stormwater runoff on creeks and streams, during and after construction. Techniques and technologies to treat such water are known as best management practices (BMPs). State-of-the-art BMPs used along the ICC's construction project were described in an article in Land and Water magazine. Some of the methods being used to control runoff were described in a The Baltimore Sun "On the Outdoors" column, published after the writer toured several work areas along the ICC's right-of-way:

The ICC project employs teams of "stormbusters" to put down straw and grass seed and erect plastic silt fences in construction areas before it rains to prevent erosion. Solar-powered stream monitors give Baker and enforcement personnel a real-time reading of water conditions. Paved storm-water ditches in older neighborhoods abutting the highway will be replaced by grass-lined swales that will filter and cool the water before it enters tributaries.

The Sun column went on to describe financial incentives that will be paid to construction contractors that meet environmental goals and requirements.

As part of construction work, several archaeological sites have been found in the path of the ICC, including a Native American site near Georgia Avenue and Norbeck Road that contains artifacts dating to the Stone Age. and near US 29, the 19th century homestead of a freed slave, Melinda Jackson, containing numerous artifacts.

== Associated construction projects ==
=== ICC Trail ===
The ICC Trail is a combination multi-use trail and on road route along the general path of the ICC. It includes about 7 miles of trail and 11 miles along parallel roads. A bicycle trail had long been identified in County master plans as part of the proposed ICC, both in Montgomery County and Prince George's County.

However, in 2004, the SHA announced that it was dropping the ICC bike trail from its own plans due to cost and environmental footprint. This move was unpopular, with comments sent to the state's ICC web page overwhelmingly in favor of a bike trail; the Montgomery County Council voted 8–0 in favor of the trail and the state said it would consider five unconnected segments that would run along 40 percent of the ICC. When the State Highway Administration published its final plan for the ICC in May 2006, it recommended seven miles of the 18-mile trail be built as part of the highway and the remaining 11 miles be constructed separate from the highway project. The state later agreed to build 11.4 miles of a trail in separate segments in Prince George's and Montgomery counties.

In response, Montgomery County began the process of amending the ICC limited functional Master Plan to include the new design for the bike path in October 2007. One proposal was to keep a mostly parallel route by utilizing county park lands for the trail, but the County Council voted against that because it would be too harmful to some county parkland. The amendment was approved in April 2009, and it proposed a bikeway near the Intercounty Connector as well as a plan that would divert bike traffic along New Hampshire Avenue, Route 29, East Randolph and Fairland roads. The council approved the options with the idea that one or both would be exercised.

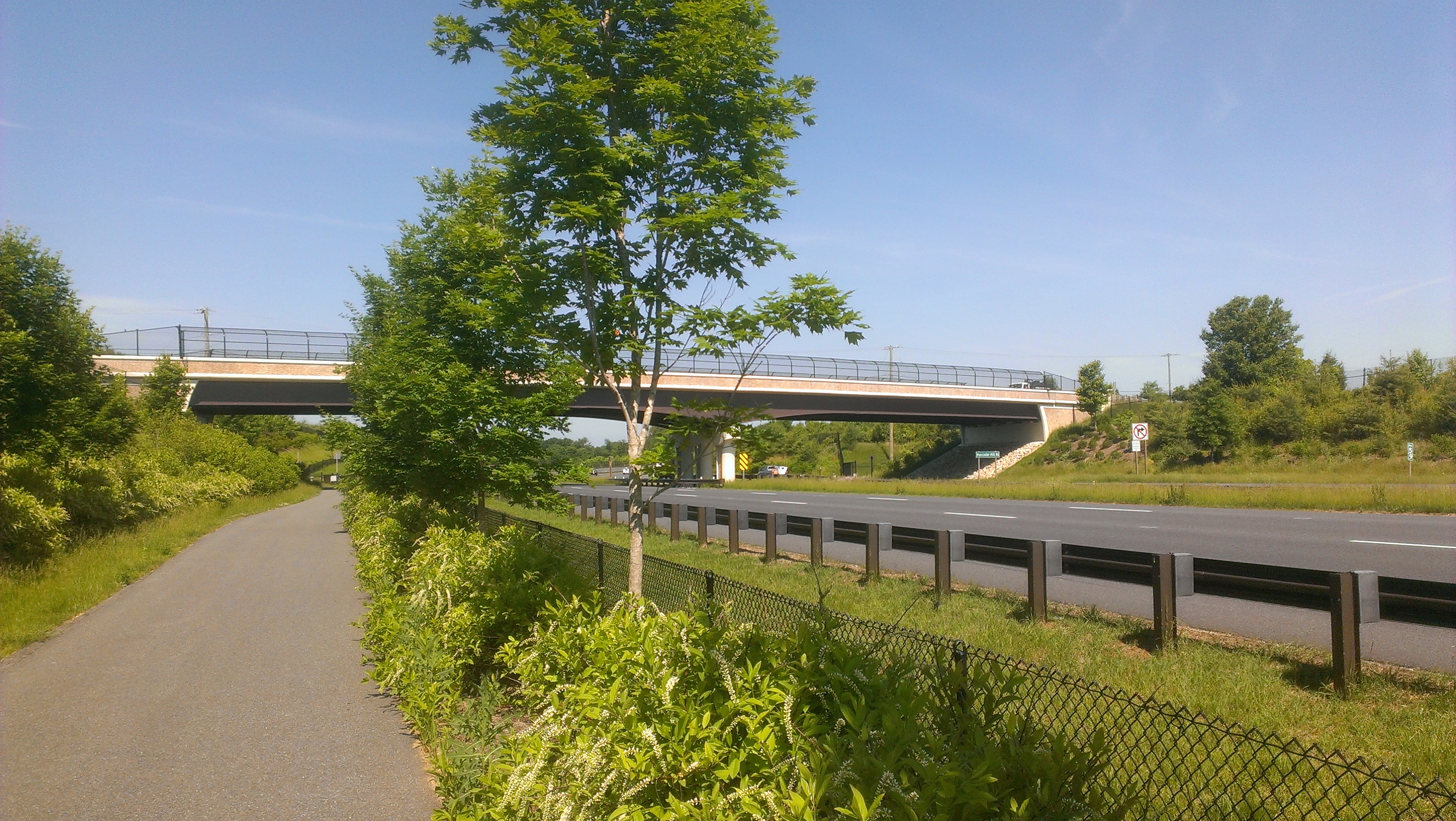
View of the ICC Trail at Muncaster Mill Road

Construction of the ICC Trail began alongside construction of MD 200. The first segment to open was the westernmost section, from Needwood Road to MD 28 (Norbeck Road), mostly following the MD 200 right-of-way except for a portion that follows Emory Lane to Georgia Avenue. This section opened on July 30, 2011, shortly after the first part of the ICC opened, and was later extended to MD 182 (Layhill Road).

Three more segments opened later in 2011: one from Notley Road to MD 650 (New Hampshire Avenue) running behind the southern sound wall of the highway; one along US 29 between Fairland and Briggs Chaney Roads and a third along MD 200 from Briggs Chaney Road to the existing Little Paint Branch Trail. A fifth segment, from Konterra Drive to US 1 (Baltimore Avenue), was completed in 2015 and follows the easternmost section of MD 200.

Separately, in 2009, work began on the ICC Connector—a shared-use path along Needwood Road that links the ICC Trail to the Shady Grove Metro Station. Prior to 2011 a side path was constructed along Briggs Chaney Road that connects the US 29 section of the ICC to the Little Paint Branch section.

Future segments of the trail are to be planned and built by county governments.

== Exit list ==
Exit numbers and mile markers are a continuation of those along I-370.

County	Location	mi	km	Exit	Destinations	Notes
Montgomery	Gaithersburg	2.540	4.088		I-370 west to I-270	Continuation west
Montgomery	Gaithersburg	2.540	4.088	3	Shady Grove Road – Metro Station	Metro Access Road is officially MD 200A but is signed as I-370; signed as exits 3A (Shady Grove) and 3B (Metro) eastbound; last eastbound exit before toll
Montgomery	Derwood	4.114	6.621	Toll Gantry (eastbound)		
Montgomery	Derwood	6.330	10.187	Toll Gantry (westbound)		
Montgomery	Norbeck	8.204	13.203	8	MD 97 (Georgia Avenue) – Olney, Wheaton	Originally signed as exits 9A (south) and 9B (north), but was renumbered as exits 8A (south) and 8B (north) when the second segment opened on November 22, 2011
Montgomery	Norbeck	8.760	14.098	9	MD 28 (Norbeck Road)	Former terminus
Montgomery	Aspen Hill	9.460	15.224	Toll Gantry (eastbound)		
Montgomery	Aspen Hill	9.770	15.723	Toll Gantry (westbound)		
Montgomery	Aspen Hill	10.445	16.810	10	MD 182 (Layhill Road) – Norwood, Glenmont	
Montgomery	Colesville	11.541	18.573	Toll Gantry (eastbound)		
Montgomery	Colesville	12.132	19.525	Toll Gantry (westbound)		
Montgomery	Colesville	13.245	21.316	13	MD 650 (New Hampshire Avenue) – Ashton, White Oak	
Montgomery	Fairland	14.467	23.282	Toll Gantry (eastbound)		
Montgomery	Fairland	15.165	24.406	Toll Gantry (westbound)		
Montgomery	Fairland	15.978	25.714	16	US 29 – Silver Spring, Columbia	Also includes access for Briggs Chaney Road eastbound; signed as exits 16A (south) and 16B (north)
Montgomery	Fairland	16.747	26.952	17	Briggs Chaney Road	Westbound exit and eastbound entrance
Prince George's	Calverton	17.516	28.189	Toll Gantry (eastbound)		
Prince George's	Calverton	17.576	28.286	Toll Gantry (westbound)		
Prince George's	Laurel	18.607	29.945	19	I-95 – Baltimore, Washington	Signed as exits 19A (south) and 19B (north); exit 31 on I-95
Prince George's	Laurel	18.639	29.997	19C	To MD 198 – Laurel, Burtonsville	Direct access from eastbound MD 200 to the Konterra Drive interchange and the I-95 collector-distributor lanes between MD 200 and MD 198
Prince George's	Laurel	19.121	30.772	Toll Gantry (westbound)		
Prince George's	Laurel	19.228	30.944	Toll Gantry (eastbound)		
Prince George's	Laurel	19.693	31.693	20	Konterra Drive (MD 206)	Eastbound exit and westbound entrance
Prince George's	Laurel	19.788	31.846	Toll Gantry (eastbound)		
Prince George's	Laurel	19.791	31.851	Toll Gantry (westbound)		
Prince George's	Laurel	20.008	32.200		US 1 – Laurel, Beltsville	Eastern terminus; continuous-flow intersection, access to Muirkirk station
1.000 mi = 1.609 km; 1.000 km = 0.621 mi: Closed/former; Electronic toll collection; Incomplete access

== Auxiliary route ==
- MD 200A is the unsigned designation for Metro Access Road, a four-lane freeway that runs from the entrance to the Shady Grove station of Washington Metro's Red Line and an interchange with Shady Grove Road north to an interchange with the western terminus of MD 200 and the eastern terminus of I-370. The route is 0.51 mi (0.82 km) long. MD 200A was designated in 2010, replacing the previous I-370 designation that was realigned to connect with MD 200.

== See also ==
- Förbifart Stockholm, a western bypass motorway under construction around Stockholm, Sweden
- Ontario Highway 407, a similar toll road through the suburbs of Toronto, Ontario
- Interstate 355, a toll road similar to the ICC (in some respects) in the suburbs of Chicago, Illinois
- M-6, a similar freeway that was built as a toll-free bypass south of Grand Rapids, Michigan
- Maryland Route 100, a similar outer beltway segment around Baltimore, Maryland
- Triangle Expressway (NC 147 and NC 540), a similar toll road in Durham and Wake counties, North Carolina
