= South Laurel, Maryland =

- Census-designated place
- Location of South Laurel, Maryland
- Coordinates: 39°4′22″N 76°51′4″W
- Country: United States
- State: Maryland
- County: Prince George's

Area
  - Total: 8.10 sq mi (20.99 km^{2})
  - Land: 8.07 sq mi (20.90 km^{2})
  - Water: 0.035 sq mi (0.09 km^{2})
- Elevation: 161 ft (49 m)

Population (2020)
  - Total: 29,602
  - Density: 3,668.1/sq mi (1,416.25/km^{2})
- Time zone: UTC−5 (Eastern (EST))
  - Summer (DST): UTC−4 (EDT)
- FIPS code: 24-73650
- GNIS feature ID: 1867303

South Laurel is an unincorporated area and census-designated place (CDP) in Prince George's County, Maryland, United States. Per the 2020 census, the population was 29,602.

== Geography ==
South Laurel is located at 39°4′22″N 76°51′4″W (39.072741, −76.851007).

According to the United States Census Bureau, the CDP has a total area of 8.2 square miles (21.2 km^{2}), of which 8.2 square miles (21.2 km^{2}) is land and 0.04 square miles (0.1 km^{2}), or 0.42%, is water.

== Demographics ==
Historical population
Census	Pop.	Note	%±
2000	20,479		—
2010	26,112		27.5%
2020	29,602		13.4%
U.S. Decennial Census; 2010 2020

=== Racial and ethnic composition ===
South Laurel CDP, Maryland – Racial and ethnic composition Note: the US Census treats Hispanic/Latino as an ethnic category. This table excludes Latinos from the racial categories and assigns them to a separate category. Hispanics/Latinos may be of any race.
Race / Ethnicity (NH = Non-Hispanic)	Pop 2010	Pop 2020	% 2010	% 2020
White alone (NH)	4,798	3,911	18.37%	13.21%
Black or African American alone (NH)	15,586	16,609	59.69%	56.11%
Native American or Alaska Native alone (NH)	50	61	0.19%	0.21%
Asian alone (NH)	1,340	1,744	5.13%	5.89%
Native Hawaiian or Pacific Islander alone (NH)	6	12	0.02%	0.04%
Other race alone (NH)	85	177	0.33%	0.60%
Mixed race or Multiracial (NH)	712	1,035	2.73%	3.50%
Hispanic or Latino (any race)	3,535	6,053	13.54%	20.45%
Total	26,112	29,602	100.00%	100.00%

=== 2020 census ===
As of the 2020 census, South Laurel had a population of 29,602. The median age was 34.6 years. 24.5% of residents were under the age of 18 and 10.7% of residents were 65 years of age or older. For every 100 females there were 89.6 males, and for every 100 females age 18 and over there were 85.1 males age 18 and over.

98.3% of residents lived in urban areas, while 1.7% lived in rural areas.

There were 10,839 households in South Laurel, of which 36.0% had children under the age of 18 living in them. Of all households, 37.7% were married-couple households, 20.0% were households with a male householder and no spouse or partner present, and 35.0% were households with a female householder and no spouse or partner present. About 28.6% of all households were made up of individuals and 5.5% had someone living alone who was 65 years of age or older.

There were 11,404 housing units, of which 5.0% were vacant. The homeowner vacancy rate was 0.8% and the rental vacancy rate was 5.5%.

Racial composition as of the 2020 census
Race	Number	Percent
White	4,387	14.8%
Black or African American	16,911	57.1%
American Indian and Alaska Native	302	1.0%
Asian	1,766	6.0%
Native Hawaiian and Other Pacific Islander	14	0.0%
Some other race	3,662	12.4%
Two or more races	2,560	8.6%

=== 2000 census ===
As of the census of 2000, there were 20,479 people, 8,260 households, and 5,055 families residing in the CDP. The population density was 4,785.1 inhabitants per square mile (1,847.5/km^{2}). There were 8,621 housing units at an average density of 2,014.4 per square mile (777.8/km^{2}). The racial makeup of the CDP was 38.68% White, 49.70% African American, 0.19% Native American, 5.61% Asian, 0.03% Pacific Islander, 2.55% from other races, and 3.23% from two or more races. Hispanic or Latino of any race were 5.26% of the population.

There were 8,260 households, out of which 33.6% had children under the age of 18 living with them, 38.6% were married couples living together, 17.2% had a female householder with no husband present, and 38.8% were non-families. 30.0% of all households were made up of individuals, and 5.1% had someone living alone who was 65 years of age or older. The average household size was 2.45 and the average family size was 3.06.

In the CDP, the population was spread out, with 26.2% under the age of 18, 10.0% from 18 to 24, 38.4% from 25 to 44, 18.5% from 45 to 64, and 6.8% who were 65 years of age or older. The median age was 31 years. For every 100 females, there were 90.9 males. For every 100 females age 18 and over, there were 86.6 males.

The median income for a household in the CDP was $51,043, and the median income for a family was $60,028. Males had a median income of $38,559 versus $32,068 for females. The per capita income for the CDP was $24,564. About 3.5% of families and 5.9% of the population were below the poverty line, including 8.9% of those under age 18 and 3.0% of those age 65 or over.

== Government and infrastructure ==
The U.S. Postal Service operates the Montpelier Post Office in South Laurel CDP.

== Education ==
=== Primary and secondary schools ===
South Laurel CDP is served by schools in the Prince George's County Public Schools.

Zoned elementary schools serving sections of the CDP include: Deerfield Run, James Harrison, Laurel, Montpelier, Oaklands, and Vansville.

Most residents are zoned to Dwight D. Eisenhower Middle School in South Laurel while some are zoned to Martin Luther King Middle School in Beltsville. All residents are zoned to Laurel High School in Laurel.

=== University ===
Capitol Technology University is in South Laurel, on the site of the former Beltsville Speedway (a.k.a. Baltimore-Washington Speedway).
