= West Laurel, Maryland =

- Census-designated place
- Location of West Laurel, Maryland (using 1990 and 2000 Census Bureau boundaries)
- Coordinates: 39°6′32″N 76°53′37″W
- Country: United States
- State: Maryland
- County: Prince George's

Area
  - Total: 2.37 sq mi (6.13 km^{2})
  - Land: 2.26 sq mi (5.86 km^{2})
  - Water: 0.10 sq mi (0.26 km^{2}) 4.29%
- Elevation: 351 ft (107 m)

Population (2020)
  - Total: 4,428
  - Density: 1,956.3/sq mi (755.35/km^{2})
- Time zone: UTC−5 (Eastern (EST))
  - Summer (DST): UTC−4 (EDT)
- FIPS code: 24-83025
- GNIS feature ID: 1867305

West Laurel is an unincorporated area and census-designated place (CDP) in Prince George's County, Maryland, United States. Per the 2020 census, the population was 4,428.

== History ==
As of the 2010 U.S. census some areas previously defined by the U.S. Census Bureau as "West Laurel" were put in a new CDP, Konterra.

== Geography ==
West Laurel is located at 39°6′32″N 76°53′37″W (39.108858, −76.893486).

According to the United States Census Bureau, the CDP has a total area of 2.4 square miles (6.2 km^{2}), of which 2.3 square miles (5.9 km^{2}) is land and 0.1 square miles (0.3 km^{2}), or 4.29%, is water.

== Demographics ==
Historical population
| Census | Pop. | Note | %± |
|---|---|---|---|
| 2000 | 4,083 | | — |
| 2010 | 4,230 | | 3.6% |
| 2020 | 4,428 | | 4.7% |
U.S. Decennial Census; 2010 2020

=== Racial and ethnic composition ===
West Laurel CDP, Maryland – Racial and ethnic composition Note: the US Census treats Hispanic/Latino as an ethnic category. This table excludes Latinos from the racial categories and assigns them to a separate category. Hispanics/Latinos may be of any race.
| Race / Ethnicity (NH = Non-Hispanic) | Pop 2000 | Pop 2010 | Pop 2020 | % 2000 | % 2010 | % 2020 |
|---|---|---|---|---|---|---|
| White alone (NH) | 3,355 | 2,754 | 2,294 | 82.17% | 65.11% | 51.81% |
| Black or African American alone (NH) | 379 | 686 | 796 | 9.28% | 16.22% | 17.98% |
| Native American or Alaska Native alone (NH) | 0 | 4 | 3 | 0.00% | 0.09% | 0.07% |
| Asian alone (NH) | 148 | 205 | 316 | 3.62% | 4.85% | 7.14% |
| Native Hawaiian or Pacific Islander alone (NH) | 0 | 1 | 0 | 0.00% | 0.02% | 0.00% |
| Other race alone (NH) | 6 | 16 | 24 | 0.15% | 0.38% | 0.54% |
| Mixed race or Multiracial (NH) | 55 | 108 | 261 | 1.35% | 2.55% | 5.89% |
| Hispanic or Latino (any race) | 140 | 456 | 734 | 3.43% | 10.78% | 16.58% |
| Total | 4,083 | 4,230 | 4,428 | 100.00% | 100.00% | 100.00% |

=== 2020 census ===
As of the 2020 census, West Laurel had a population of 4,428. The median age was 44.1 years. 20.4% of residents were under the age of 18 and 20.1% of residents were 65 years of age or older. For every 100 females there were 91.6 males, and for every 100 females age 18 and over there were 91.8 males age 18 and over.

100.0% of residents lived in urban areas, while 0.0% lived in rural areas.

There were 1,523 households in West Laurel, of which 29.7% had children under the age of 18 living in them. Of all households, 62.4% were married-couple households, 12.5% were households with a male householder and no spouse or partner present, and 21.3% were households with a female householder and no spouse or partner present. About 19.1% of all households were made up of individuals and 10.6% had someone living alone who was 65 years of age or older.

There were 1,565 housing units, of which 2.7% were vacant. The homeowner vacancy rate was 0.8% and the rental vacancy rate was 4.7%.

=== 2000 census ===
As of the census of 2000, there were 4,083 people, 1,436 households, and 1,203 families residing in the CDP. The population density was 1,005.7 inhabitants per square mile (388.3/km^{2}). There were 1,461 housing units at an average density of 359.9 per square mile (139.0/km^{2}). The racial makeup of the CDP was 84.47% White, 9.33% African American, 3.62% Asian, 0.02% Pacific Islander, 0.81% from other races, and 1.74% from two or more races. Hispanic or Latino of any race were 3.43% of the population.

There were 1,436 households, out of which 33.9% had children under the age of 18 living with them, 73.1% were married couples living together, 7.7% had a female householder with no husband present, and 16.2% were non-families. 12.5% of all households were made up of individuals, and 5.2% had someone living alone who was 65 years of age or older. The average household size was 2.84 and the average family size was 3.08.

In the CDP, the population was spread out, with 24.3% under the age of 18, 4.9% from 18 to 24, 26.4% from 25 to 44, 30.8% from 45 to 64, and 13.5% who were 65 years of age or older. The median age was 42 years. For every 100 females, there were 97.2 males. For every 100 females age 18 and over, there were 93.5 males.

The median income for a household in the CDP was $83,663, and the median income for a family was $86,797. Males had a median income of $51,757 versus $39,000 for females. The per capita income for the CDP was $32,067. About 1.2% of families and 2.2% of the population were below the poverty line, including 0.5% of those under age 18 and 4.7% of those age 65 or over.

== Education ==
West Laurel CDP is served by schools in the Prince George's County Public Schools.

Zoned schools serving sections of the CDP include Bond Mill Elementary School in West Laurel, Martin Luther King Middle School in Beltsville, and Laurel High School in Laurel.
