= Hillsborough, Maryland =

Unincorporated community in Maryland, United States

- Unincorporated community
- Location within Maryland
- Coordinates: 39°07′10″N 76°53′46″W
- Country: United States of America
- State: Maryland
- County: Prince George's
- Elevation: 400 ft (120 m)
- Time zone: UTC-5 (Eastern (EST))
  - Summer (DST): UTC-4 (EDT)
- Area codes: 301 & 240
- GNIS feature ID: 597560

Hillsborough is an unincorporated community in Prince George's County, Maryland, United States. Hillsborough is close to the northern tip of Prince George's County, 2.9 miles (4.7 km) west-northwest of Laurel.
