= Muirkirk, Maryland =

Unincorporated community in Maryland, United States

Muirkirk
- Unincorporated community
- Location within the state of Maryland Muirkirk (the United States)
- Coordinates: 39°03′42″N 76°53′07″W
- Country: United States of America
- State: Maryland
- County: Prince George's
- Time zone: UTC-5 (Eastern (EST))
  - Summer (DST): UTC-4 (EDT)
- GNIS feature ID: 597797

Muirkirk is an unincorporated community in northern Prince George's County, Maryland, United States, located between Baltimore and Washington in the central part of the state.

It is located along U.S. Route 1 between Beltsville and Laurel. It has a stop on the MARC commuter rail (on the Camden line), and hosts a dinosaur park.

Many Muirkirk residents work for government agencies such as NASA's Goddard Space Flight Center, the Food and Drug Administration and the headquarters of the Washington Suburban Sanitary Commission.

== History ==
Muirkirk was the historic location of Muirkirk Furnace, from which the area takes its name. The ironworks were established before the American Civil War. After the conflict began, the US government hired a manager from the North, Charles Coffin, to ensure the works were kept under federal control.

Located along Old Muirkirk Road, near Muirkirk station and just east of the former furnace, is the historic African-American community of Rossville, originally composed mostly of families of men who labored at the ironworks. It has existed for more than 100 years. In 1868 after the Civil War, six black men purchased property for a church and cemetery, forming the Queens Chapel Methodist Episcopal Church in the rural enclave colloquially referred to as "Swamp Poodle." Part of the property was already in use as a burial ground. They intended to use the church building, originally a small log structure, as a school for their children. This was the start of a postwar cohesive black community in which freedmen established a church independent of white supervision. The Queen's Chapel church was rebuilt in the 1950s.

Around 1885, the estate of landowner Mark Duvall, who owned considerable property in the Vansville area, provided for the sale of 28.5 acres (115,000 m^{2}) just east of Queen's Chapel. The twelve lots made available were quickly settled by African Americans, many of whom worked at nearby Muirkirk Furnace. Augustus Ross, after whom the community was named, built one of the first houses.

The largest lot was purchased by Rebecca Lodge #6, Benevolent Sons and Daughters of Abraham, a black fraternal organization whose members established the historic Abraham Hall. The lodge hall functioned for years as the community school for black children, as the state had segregated facilities. In 1922 the black community raised matching funds and gained white school board members' approval to build a Rosenwald School to improve the educational facilities for black children. Historically black schools were underfunded. This former school was more recently used as an American Legion post.

Charles H. Stanley of Laurel sold 25 acres (100,000 m^{2}) of land to blacks in Rossville, as documented with the Maryland Historical Trust.

=== Historic sites ===
The following is a list of historic sites in Rossville, near Muirkirk, identified by the Maryland-National Capital Park and Planning Commission:

	Site Name	Image	Location	M-NCPPC Inventory Number	Comment
1	Abraham Hall		7612 Old Muirkirk Rd.	62-023-07	Located at Rossville. Listed on the National Register of Historic Places, 2005-03-14
2	Thomas Matthews House		7700 Old Muirkirk Road	62-23-17	Located at Rossville.
3	Muirkirk School		7813 Muirkirk Road	62-23-20	Located at Rossville.
4	Queen's Chapel Methodist Episcopal Church Site and Cemetery		7410 Old Muirkirk Road	62-23-21	Located at Rossville.

== Education ==
Prince George's County Public Schools operates public schools serving Muirkirk; James H. Harrison Elementary, Martin Luther King Jr Middle, and Laurel High School are among the nearest. Area private schools include Beltsville Adventist, Faith Baptist Christian, and High Road School.

During the era of legally-required racial segregation of schools, black students from Muirkirk attended Lakeland High School in College Park in the period 1928–1950; Fairmont Heights High School, then near Fairmount Heights, replaced Lakeland High and served black students only from 1950 to 1964; around 1964, legally-required racial segregation of schools ended.
