= Special Collection Service =

Classified joint CIA–NSA program to insert eavesdropping equipment in difficult places

Coordinates: 39.045°N 76.857°W

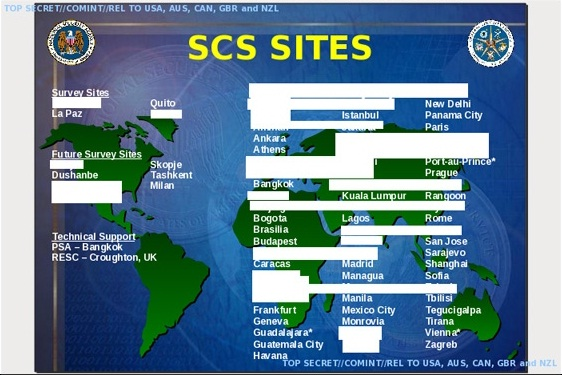
Locations of CIA/NSA Special Collection Service (SCS) eavesdropping sites in 2004

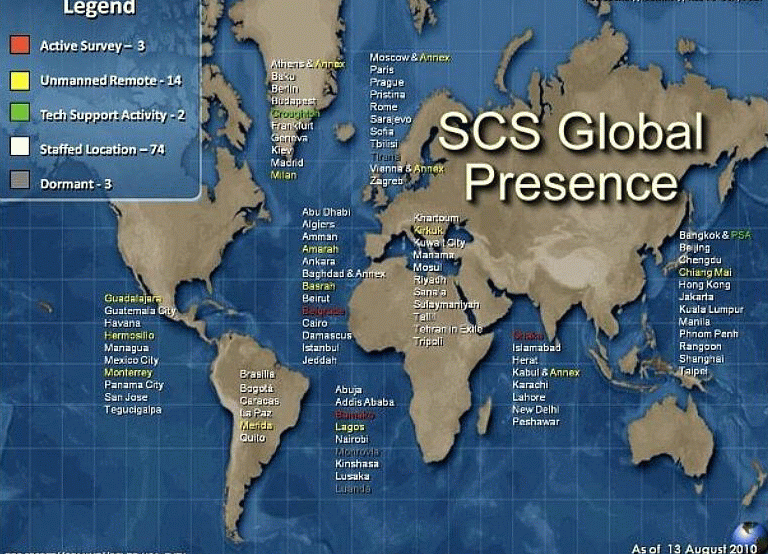
Location and status of CIA/NSA Special Collection Service (SCS) eavesdropping sites as of August 13, 2010

The Special Collection Service (SCS) is a highly classified joint U.S. Central Intelligence Agency–National Security Agency program charged with inserting eavesdropping equipment in difficult-to-reach places, such as foreign embassies, communications centers, and foreign government installations. Established in the late 1970s and headquartered in Beltsville, Maryland, the SCS has been involved in operations ranging from the Cold War to hunting al-Qaeda after the September 11 attacks.

== Mission ==
The SCS is a U.S. black budget program that has been described as the United States' "Mission Impossible force," responsible for "close surveillance, burglary, wiretapping, breaking and entering." It is headquartered in Beltsville, Maryland, in an obscured building that was at one time labeled simply "CSSG" and is sometimes designated as "F6". Next door is the U.S. Department of State's Beltsville Information Management Center, to which the SCS is linked via fiber optic cable. The SCS is jointly staffed by the Central Intelligence Agency (CIA) and the National Security Agency (NSA). According to intelligence historian James Bamford, "The position of SCS chief alternates between NSA and CIA officials." SCS operatives are based out of U.S. embassies and consulates overseas, and operatives often use Foreign Service or Diplomatic Telecommunications Service cover when deployed. Their mission is to intercept sensitive information on espionage, nuclear arms, terrorist networks, drug trafficking and other national-security-related issues.

The SCS was established to overcome a problem in that the NSA typically intercepts communications "passively" from its various intercept facilities throughout the world, yet the increasing sophistication of foreign communications equipment renders passive interception futile and instead requires direct access to the communications equipment. The CIA, meanwhile, has access to agents specializing in clandestine operations and thus is more able to gain access to foreign communication equipment, yet lacks the NSA's expertise in communications eavesdropping. Hence, the SCS was born, combining the communications intelligence capabilities of the NSA with the covert action capabilities of the CIA in order to facilitate access to sophisticated foreign communications systems.

The SCS employs exotic covert listening device technologies to bug foreign embassies, communications centers, computer facilities, fiber-optic networks, and government installations. The U.S. government has never officially acknowledged its existence, and little is known about the technologies and techniques it employs. The sole inside account of SCS comes from a Canadian, Mike Frost, whose 1994 book Spyworld revealed that the program was known to insiders at the time as "College Park". As of 2008, the SCS is reported to target for recruitment key foreign communications personnel such as database managers, systems administrators, and information technology specialists.

During October 2013, reports by former NSA contractor Edward Snowden led to the unveiling of the SCS having systematically wiretapped Chancellor of Germany Angela Merkel's private cell phone over a period of over 10 years, which among other activities to wiretap and systematically record large amounts of European and South American leaders' and citizens' communication by the NSA led to a distinct diplomatic backlash at the United States government.

== History ==
=== Background ===
The SCS program was established in 1978 during the Cold War between the United States and the Soviet Union.

As encryption technology increased in sophistication, by the end of the 20th century many coded signals proved unbreakable. Due to this problem, bugging techniques and technologies saw a revival: unable to easily intercept and decrypt foreign communications through passive means, the U.S. government needed to instead intercept the communications at their source, and thus the SCS program was expanded in the 1990s to fulfill this need.

=== Snowden Leak ===
According to documents leaked by Edward Snowden, the SCS is part of a larger global surveillance program known as STATEROOM.

== Activities ==
=== Cold War ===
SCS operatives reportedly hid eavesdropping devices in pigeons perched on the windowsills of the Soviet Embassy in Washington, D.C.

=== Infiltration ===
The SCS program was compromised by infamous Federal Bureau of Investigation (FBI) mole Robert Hanssen in the 1990s, which provided Moscow with sensitive information about highly sophisticated U.S. overseas bugging operations. However, the program was so secret that, after Hanssen's arrest, the FBI would only describe it in general terms, as a "program of enormous value, expense, and importance to the U.S. government".

=== Afghanistan ===
In 1999, as the Clinton Administration sought to kill Osama bin Laden following the 1998 U.S. embassy bombings, SCS operatives covertly entered Afghanistan to place eavesdropping devices within range of al-Qaeda's tactical radios.

=== China ===
The SCS was rumored to have been involved in the 2001 operation that planted 27 satellite-controlled bugs in the Boeing 767-300ER that was to be used as Chinese leader Jiang Zemin's official jet. The bugs were discovered, however, before they could be switched on.

=== Iraq War ===
Prior to the 2003 U.S. invasion of Iraq, SCS was described as the "prime mover" of electronic surveillance in the country. SCS operatives built numerous antennae, spaced throughout the Iraqi countryside, capable of intercepting Iraqi microwave communications. These Iraqi communications would have been otherwise difficult to intercept, because they beamed hilltop to hilltop in a narrow band, with an angle too oblique and thus too dissipated to be intercepted by air or spacecraft.

In 1998, the U.S. government recruited an Australian operative under SCS and deployed him to Iraq. The operative reported concerns about what was transpiring in Iraq, in that there was "a very high volume of data, and that he was getting no feedback about whether it was good, bad, or useful". He further reported that "this was a massive intelligence collection operation – one that was not in accordance with what UNSCOM was supposed to be doing" at the time.

After the invasion, SCS operatives were employed in the hunt for Saddam Hussein, planting sophisticated eavesdropping equipment in target areas to intercept communications that were then analyzed by voice analysis experts.

=== Al-Qaeda ===
The SCS was heavily involved in eavesdropping to advance the war on terror, setting up eavesdropping posts around Middle Eastern capitals and figures close to Osama bin Laden's terrorism network. In 1999, an SCS team monitored al-Qaeda training camps near Khost.

When the United States located Osama bin Laden's compound in Abbottabad, Pakistan, SCS operatives established a base in an apartment that the CIA had rented a mile away from the compound. They focused lasers on the compound windows and, by analyzing the vibrations, were able to count the number of people inside and outside, and also ascertained that there was one person who never ventured outside the compound. Bin Laden was killed inside the compound during a raid by U.S. special operations forces on May 2, 2011.

== Programs ==
- STATEROOM

== See also ==
- Central Security Service
- Signals intelligence
- Tailored Access Operations
