= Lakeland High School (Maryland) =

Former high school in Maryland, US

Coordinates: 38°59′23″N 76°55′29″W

Information
- Established: 1928
- Closed: 1950 (as Lakeland High School); 1983 (as special education center)

Lakeland High School was a high school for black children located in the Lakeland community of Prince George's County, Maryland, United States, now a part of College Park. It was the second high school for black children in the county. It ceased being used for educational purposes in 1983. As of 2012, the building was being used as a church.

== History ==
After Lakeland and other area communities asked for a high school for black students, Lakeland High opened in 1928. It became one of two senior high schools in Prince George's County for black people, the other being Frederick Douglass High School, then in Upper Marlboro. The principal was Edgar A. Smith, who also taught classes there; he finished his master's degree at Temple University at the same time. Smith remained principal of the school from its opening through the schools transition to a facility serving lower grades. He retired as the school's principal in 1966. 45 students were initially in the student body.

The architect firm, based in Raleigh, North Carolina, was Linthicum and Linthicum. $1,700 of Lakeland High's financing came from the Rosenwald Fund, and Lakeland therefore was a Rosenwald School. In addition, the area black residents raised $1,500 for the school's construction. $18,400 of government money was the remainder used to construct the school, meaning it was built for a total of $21,600. Lakeland, on 4 acres (1.6 ha) of land, was in proximity to railways and was centrally located, so the Prince George's school board selected it as a high school site.

Communities in its attendance boundary included Lakeland, Beltsville, Hyattsville, Laurel, Muirkirk, and North Brentwood. Lakeland became a part of the City of College Park in 1945. By the 1940s Laurel and Mount Rainier, along with other communities, were served by Lakeland High's bus service, and the Highland Park area was added to the bus service in 1946.

In 1950, Lakeland High was replaced by Fairmont Heights High School near Fairmount Heights. In turn Lakeland Elementary School moved into the former high school building. The building also served as a junior high school and special education center. PGCPS stopped using it as a school in 1983. As of 2012 a church uses the building.
