= North Brentwood, Maryland =

- Town
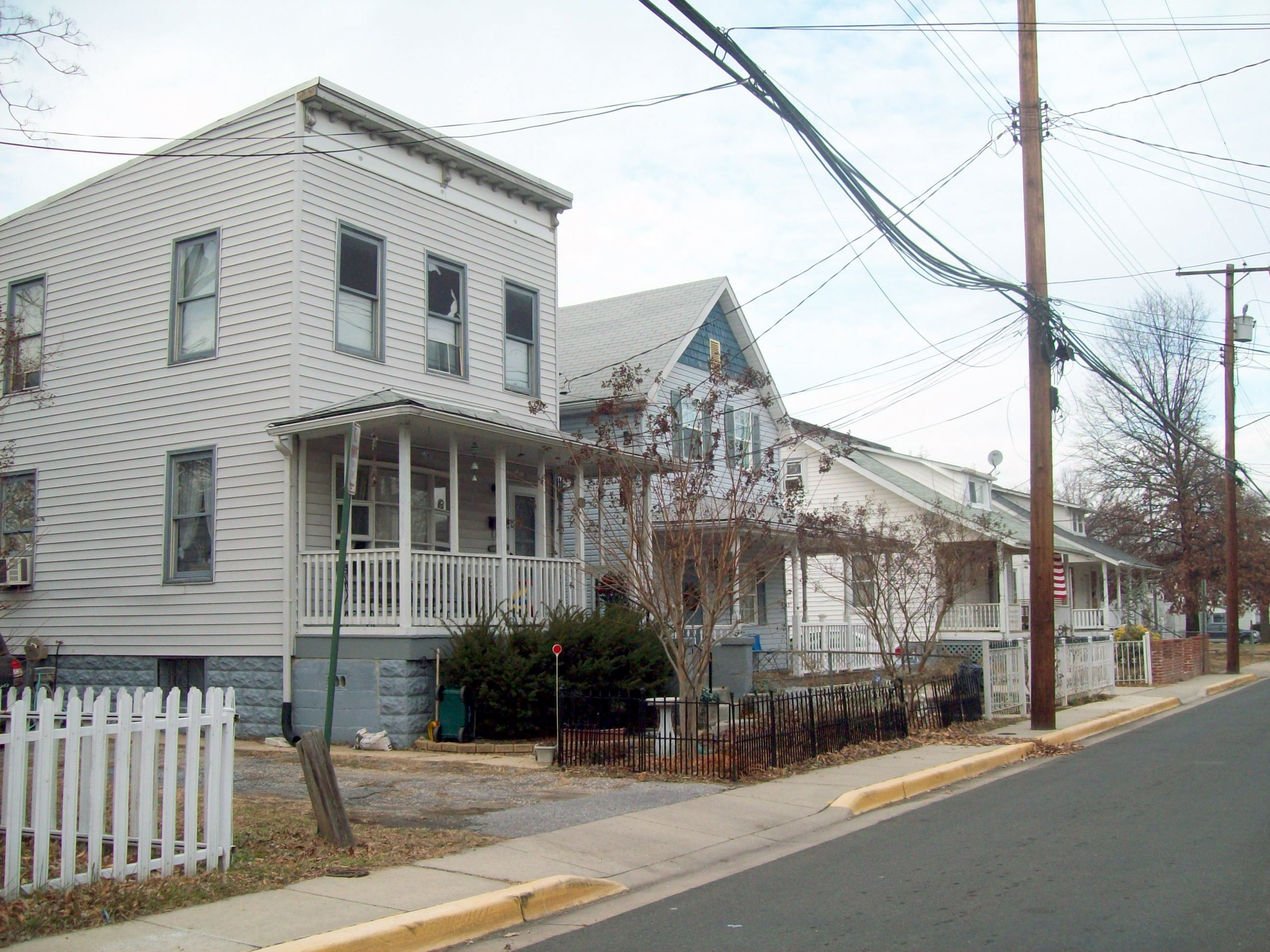
- Houses in North Brentwood

- Flag Seal

- Location of North Brentwood, Maryland
- Coordinates: 38°56′39″N 76°57′6″W
- Country: United States of America
- State: Maryland
- County: Prince George's
- Incorporated: June 12, 1924

Government
  - Type: Mayor–council
  - Mayor: Petrella Robinson

Area
  - Total: 0.11 sq mi (0.29 km^{2})
  - Land: 0.11 sq mi (0.29 km^{2})
  - Water: 0 sq mi (0.00 km^{2})
- Elevation: 9.8 ft (3 m)

Population (2020)
  - Total: 593
  - Density: 5,253.4/sq mi (2,028.33/km^{2})
- Time zone: UTC-5 (Eastern (EST))
  - Summer (DST): UTC-4 (EDT)
- ZIP code: 20722
- Area codes: 301, 240
- FIPS code: 24-56375
- GNIS feature ID: 0597814
- Website: www.northbrentwood.com

North Brentwood is a town in Prince George's County, Maryland, United States. The population was 593 at the 2020 census. The municipality of North Brentwood is located north of Washington and is surrounded by the communities of Brentwood, Hyattsville, and Cottage City, and the nearby Mount Rainier. The Town of North Brentwood was incorporated in 1924, and was the first African-American-majority municipality in Maryland.

== History ==
=== 19th century ===
The town is named after the Brentwood estate built in 1817 by Robert Brent in Northeast Washington, D.C. The town was originally settled by African-American veterans of the American Civil War, who purchased lots from their former commander, Capt. Wallace A. Bartlett, beginning in 1887.

The town was developed beginning in the 1890s around the Highland Station of the Washington Branch of the Baltimore and Ohio Railroad and the Columbia and Maryland Railway. "Brentwood" was created by Wallace A. Bartlett, a Civil War veteran, former foreman for the Government Printing Office, Patent Office examiner, and inventor originally from Warsaw, New York. Captain Bartlett lived in Washington, D.C., until 1887, when he purchased 206 acres (0.83 km^{2}) of farmland from Benjamin Holliday, which abutted the Highland subdivision. Bartlett built a farmhouse for his family on the land and, with two partners J. Lee Adams and Samuel J. Mills, formed the Holladay Land and Improvement Company.

In 1891, the Company platted a residential subdivision called "Holladay Company's Addition to Highland" on 80 acres (320,000 m^{2}) of the Bartlett Farm. The lots were approximately 40 feet (12 m) by 100 feet (30 m) and were arranged around an irregular grid of streets. The lots in the northern part of the subdivision, which eventually would become North Brentwood, were smaller and were subject to flooding from a mill race. The first lots in the northern section were purchased in 1891 by Henry Randall, an African-American man from Anne Arundel County, who built a house on Holladay Avenue (now Rhode Island Avenue). In 1894, Randall's son, Peter Randall, constructed a house next to his father's. More family members moved into the community and built homes, and the area soon became known as Randallstown.

Other African-American families soon moved to the neighborhood, including the Plummer, Wallace, and Johnson families. They built two-story front-gable frame houses, as well as free-standing rowhouses. In 1898, the City and Suburban Railway was completed through Randallstown. By 1904 that name had been replaced by Brentwood. In the early 1900s, development was faster than in the southern areas also platted by Bartlett. A school and a church were built in 1904, and the Brentwood Colored Citizens Association was formed in 1907. The association helped acquire volunteers for a fire company, fire-fighting equipment, a community hall, and electric lights. After Bartlett's neighboring development was incorporated as the town of Brentwood in 1922, Jeremiah Hawkins pushed for the incorporation of North Brentwood.

=== Incorporation ===
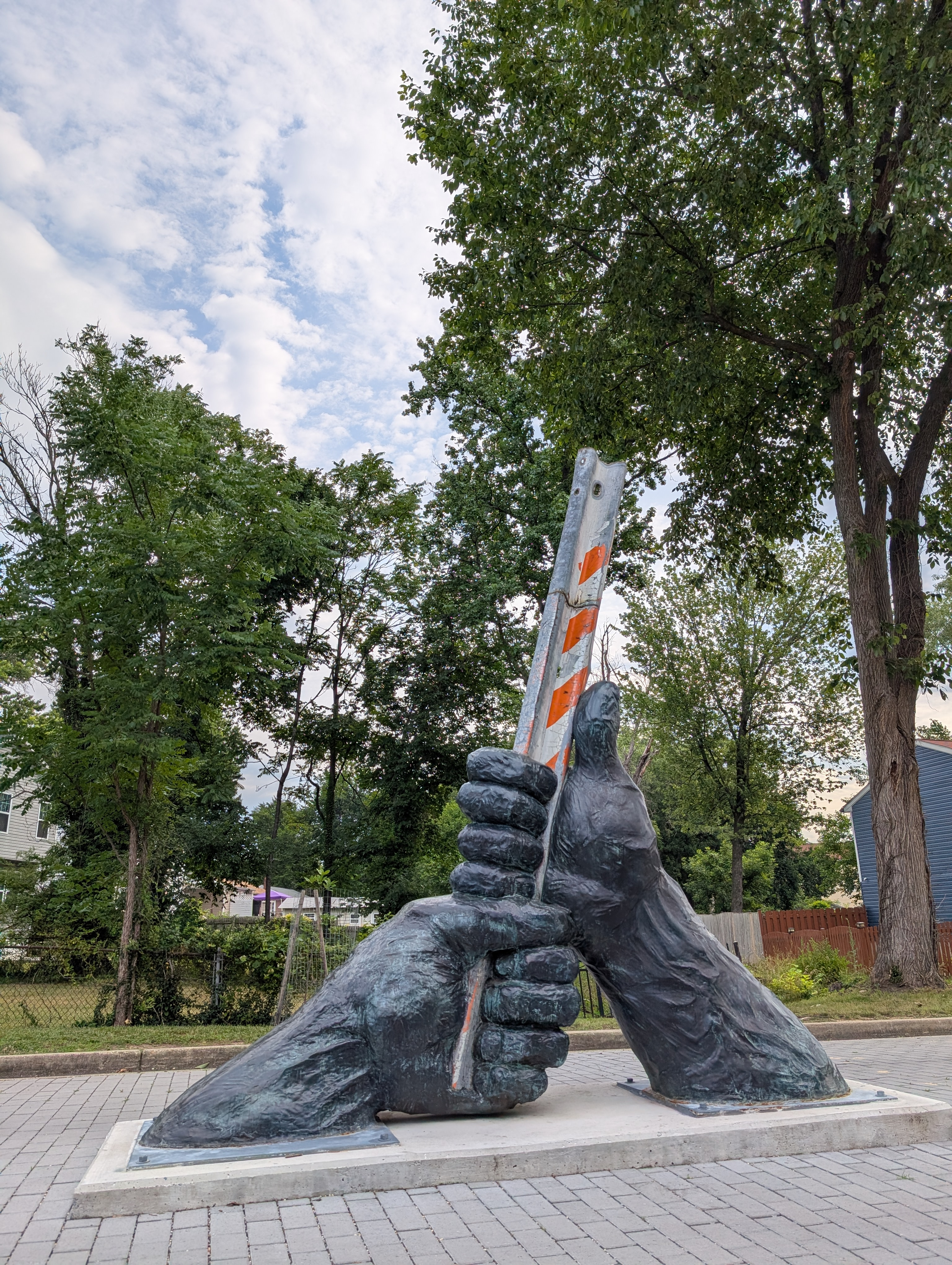
A sculpture on Windom Road, between North Brentwood, and Brentwood, Maryland, a neighboring sundown town, shows two hands removing the original barrier between the municipalities.

In April 1924, Delegate Charles B. Ager sponsored a bill to incorporate North Brentwood. The bill proposed a mayor, three council members, and a treasurer, all popularly elected. The bill passed the House of Delegates. The bill was put up to a vote of the proposed town's residents on June 12, 1924, and it passed.

At the time of its incorporation, North Brentwood was the first municipality in Maryland, and possibly the United States, without any white voters.

=== First election ===
The town held its first election on July 7, 1924. Republican Jeremiah Hawkins ran unopposed for the town's first mayor. Peter Randall and Frank Baden ran for Council member representing ward one. Horace Allen ran unopposed to represent ward two on the council. Julius Wheeler and Joseph L. Gordan ran for Council member representing ward three. Mahlia Brown and John Gilmore ran for treasurer. Hawkins, Randall, Allen, Wheeler, and Gilmore were elected.

=== Growth ===
The town continued to grow after incorporation. In September 1924, the town's first school, a three-room schoolhouse, was built. During the 1930s and 1940s, new homes were built, mostly bungalows and brick Cape Cod houses. New streets were laid out, while the existing streets were paved, extended, and renamed.

=== Historic sites ===
The following is a list of historic sites in North Brentwood identified by the Maryland-National Capital Park and Planning Commission. Much of the community is located within the North Brentwood Historic District; listed on the National Register of Historic Places in 2003.

	Site name	Image	Location	M-NCPPC Inventory Number	Comment
1	African Methodist Episcopal Zion Church of Brentwood		4037 Webster Street	68-61-11	
2	Mack Brown House		3907 Wallace Road	68-61-4	
3	Foursquares on Webster Street		3914, 3916, and 3918 Webster Street	68-61-13	
4	Jeremiah Hawkins House Site		4114 Webster Street	68-61-1	Demolished in 1991.
5	Wigginton-Brown-Bellows House		4005 Wallace Road	68-61-24	Demolished in 2009.
6	Edith Mason House		4501 41st Avenue	68-61-8	
7	McKenzie-Bullock House Site		4538 41st Avenue	68-61-9	Demolished in 1992 following fire.
8	Nelson-Queen House Site		4505 Church Street	68-61-10	Demolished in 1993 to allow for expansion of Town Hall.
9	Henry Newton House		4502 Church Street	68-61-12	
10	Robert Orr House		4528 40th Street	68-61-2	
11	Owings Houses		4533, 4535, and 4537 41st Avenue	68-61-5	
12	A.A. Randall House		4504 41st Avenue	68-61-7	
13	Peter Randall House		4508 Rhode Island Avenue	68-61-37	Built in 1892, it is the oldest dwelling in North Brentwood.
14	Seaburn House		4529 41st Avenue	68-61-6	
15	William H. Thomas House		3911 Wallace Road	68-61-3	

== Geography ==
North Brentwood is located at 38°56′39″N 76°57′6″W (38.944111, -76.951650).

According to the United States Census Bureau, the town has a total area of 0.10 square miles (0.26 km^{2}), all land.

== Demographics ==
Historical population
Census	Pop.	Note	%±
1930	641		—
1940	822		28.2%
1950	838		1.9%
1960	864		3.1%
1970	758		−12.3%
1980	568		−25.1%
1990	512		−9.9%
2000	469		−8.4%
2010	517		10.2%
2020	593		14.7%
U.S. Decennial Census; 2010 2020

=== Racial and ethnic composition ===
North Brentwood town, Maryland – Racial and ethnic composition Note: the US Census treats Hispanic/Latino as an ethnic category. This table excludes Latinos from the racial categories and assigns them to a separate category. Hispanics/Latinos may be of any race.
Race / Ethnicity (NH = Non-Hispanic)	Pop 2000	Pop 2010	Pop 2020	% 2000	% 2010	% 2020
White alone (NH)	28	10	42	5.97%	1.93%	7.08%
Black or African American alone (NH)	383	315	292	81.66%	60.93%	49.24%
Native American or Alaska Native alone (NH)	6	0	0	1.28%	0.00%	0.00%
Asian alone (NH)	6	9	12	1.28%	1.74%	2.02%
Native Hawaiian or Pacific Islander alone (NH)	0	0	0	0.00%	0.00%	0.00%
Other race alone (NH)	0	0	0	0.00%	0.00%	0.00%
Mixed race or Multiracial (NH)	9	7	16	1.92%	1.35%	2.70%
Hispanic or Latino (any race)	37	176	231	7.89%	34.04%	38.95%
Total	469	517	593	100.00%	100.00%	100.00%

=== 2010 census ===
As of the census of 2010, there were 517 people, 167 households, and 123 families residing in the town. The population density was 5,170.0 inhabitants per square mile (1,996.1/km^{2}). There were 183 housing units at an average density of 1,830.0 per square mile (706.6/km^{2}). The racial makeup of the town was 13.3% White, 63.6% African American, 0.4% Native American, 1.7% Asian, 16.2% from other races, and 4.6% from two or more races. Hispanic or Latino of any race were 34.0% of the population.

There were 167 households, of which 39.5% had children under the age of 18 living with them, 38.3% were married couples living together, 26.3% had a female householder with no husband present, 9.0% had a male householder with no wife present, and 26.3% were non-families. 21.0% of all households were made up of individuals, and 6.6% had someone living alone who was 65 years of age or older. The average household size was 3.10 and the average family size was 3.49.

The median age in the town was 36.4 years. 26.1% of residents were under the age of 18; 7.9% were between the ages of 18 and 24; 28.3% were from 25 to 44; 25.7% were from 45 to 64; and 12% were 65 years of age or older. The gender makeup of the town was 49.7% male and 50.3% female.

=== 2000 census ===
As of the census of 2000, there were 469 people, 158 households, and 112 families residing in the town. The population density was 4,450.8 inhabitants per square mile (1,718.5/km^{2}). There were 181 housing units at an average density of 1,717.7 per square mile (663.2/km^{2}). The racial makeup of the town was 6.40% White, 82.09% African American, 1.28% Native American, 1.28% Asian, 6.82% from other races, and 2.13% from two or more races. Hispanic or Latino of any race were 7.89% of the population.

There were 158 households, out of which 33.5% had children under the age of 18 living with them, 31.6% were married couples living together, 30.4% had a female householder with no husband present, and 29.1% were non-families. 22.8% of all households were made up of individuals, and 8.2% had someone living alone who was 65 years of age or older. The average household size was 2.97 and the average family size was 3.43.

In the town, the population was spread out, with 28.8% under the age of 18, 8.3% from 18 to 24, 25.6% from 25 to 44, 24.9% from 45 to 64, and 12.4% who were 65 years of age or older. The median age was 37 years. For every 100 females, there were 89.9 males. For every 100 females age 18 and over, there were 83.5 males.

The median income for a household in the town was $37,188, and the median income for a family was $45,893. Males had a median income of $32,188 versus $26,000 for females. The per capita income for the town was $18,547. About 12.6% of families and 14.2% of the population were below the poverty line, including 18.7% of those under age 18 and 22.2% of those age 65 or over.

== Government ==
Prince George's County Police Department District 1 Station in Hyattsville serves North Brentwood.

Mayoral Roster

History of Town of North Brentwood Mayors & Terms

1924 –1929, Jeremiah Hawkins

1929 –1931, George Lucas

1931 – 1933, William Allen

1933 – 1935, Julius Wheeler

1935 – 1937, John Gilmore

1937 – 1943, Sandy Baker, Sr.

1943 – 1963, William D. Bellows

1963 – 1965, Labarre Thornton

1965 – 1967, Raymond A. Hall

1967 – 1969, William D. Bellows

1969 – 1989, Raymond A. Hall

1989 – 1993, Sandy B. Johnson

1993 – 1995, Arthur J. Dock

1995 – 2007, Lillian K. Beverly

2007 – Present, Petrella A. Robinson

== Transportation ==
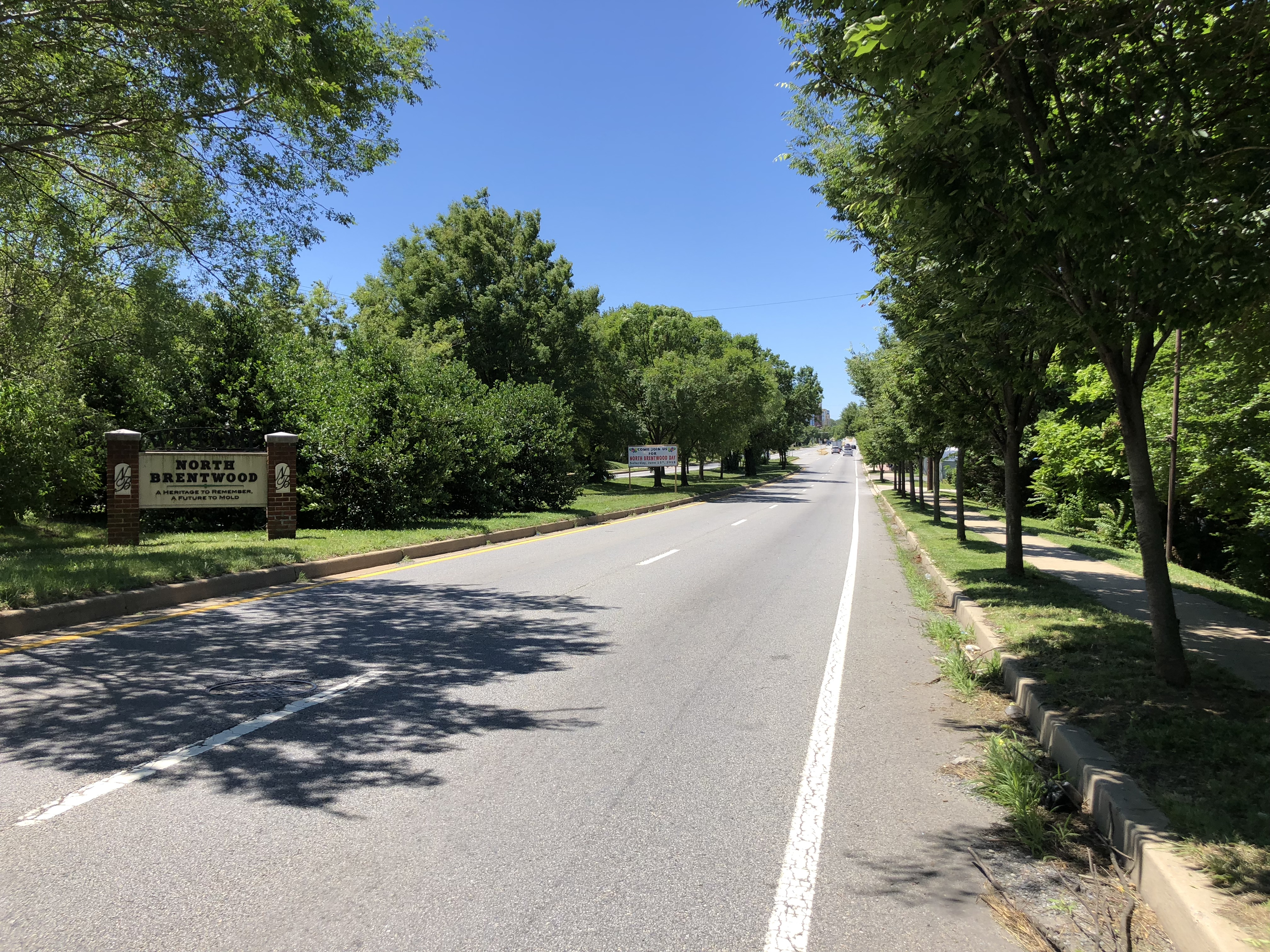
US 1 southbound entering North Brentwood

U.S. Route 1 is the only highway serving North Brentwood. It connects southward to Brentwood, Mount Rainier and Washington, D.C. To the north, it passes through Hyattsville and College Park before intersecting Interstate 95/Interstate 495 (the Capital Beltway).

== Education ==
North Brentwood is within the Prince George's County Public Schools district.

- Thomas S. Stone Elementary School
- Hyattsville Middle School
- Northwestern High School

During the era of legally-required racial segregation of schools, black students from North Brentwood attended Lakeland High School in College Park in the period 1928–1950; Fairmont Heights High School, then near Fairmount Heights, replaced Lakeland High and served black students only from 1950 to 1964; around 1964 legally-required racial segregation of schools ended.
