= North Brentwood Historic District =

Historic district in Maryland, United States

- U.S. National Register of Historic Places
- U.S. Historic district
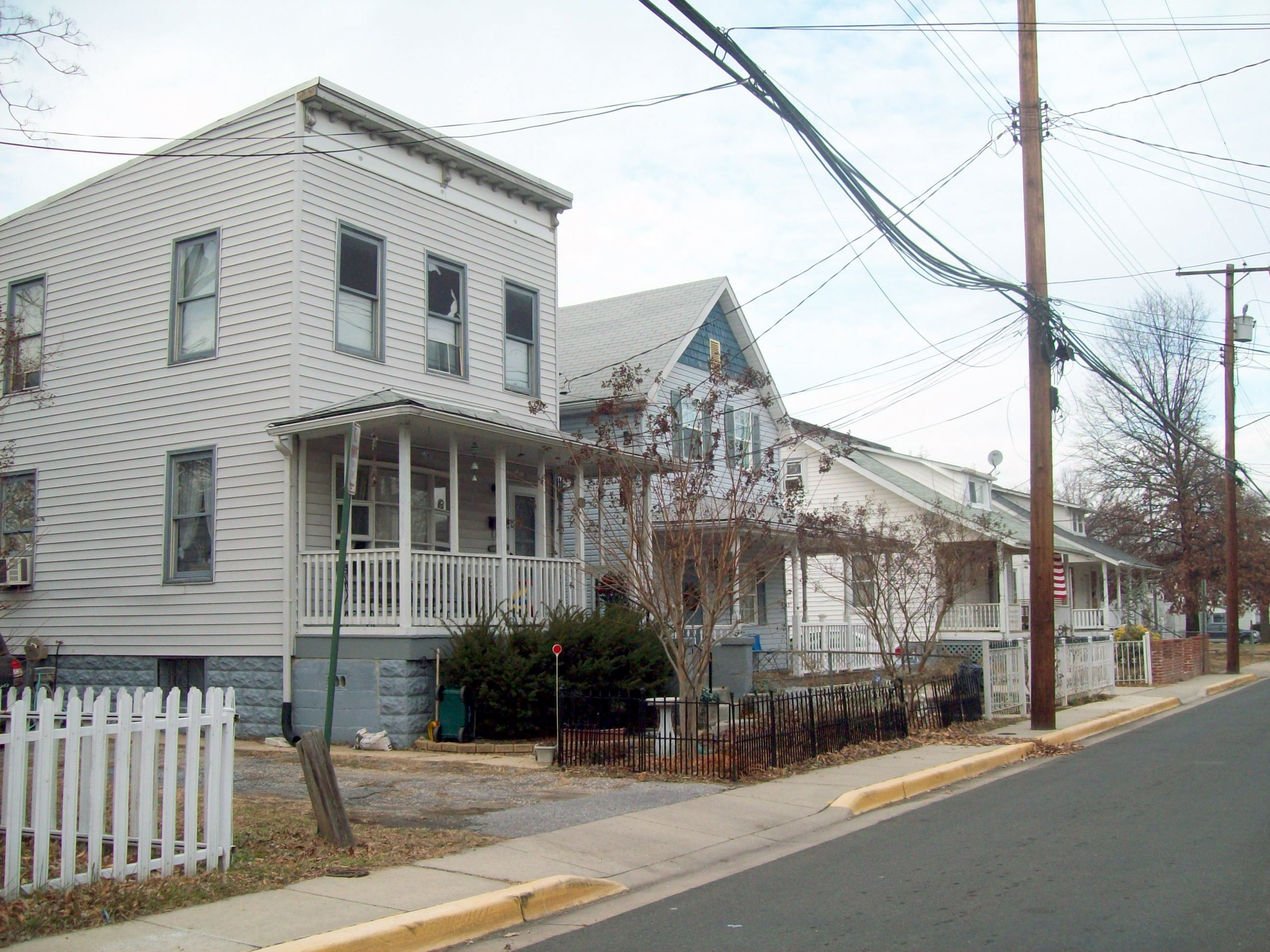
- North Brentwood Historic District, December 2010

- Location within District of Columbia
- Location: Roughly bounded by 39th Pl., Allison St., Rhode Island Ave. and Webster St., North Brentwood, Maryland
- Coordinates: 38°56′41″N 76°57′8″W
- Area: 50 acres (20 ha)
- Built: 1891
- Architectural style: Late Victorian, Late 19th And Early 20th Century American Movements
- NRHP reference No.: 03001174
- Added to NRHP: November 21, 2003

The North Brentwood Historic District, is a national historic district located in the town of North Brentwood, Prince George's County, Maryland. It was the earliest incorporated African American community in the county. The historic district comprises 128 buildings reflecting its development over the period from 1891 to 1950. All of the early vernacular dwellings were of wood-frame construction with Late Victorian inspiration. The 1920s house forms represented included bungalows, multi-family houses, and larger Foursquares. Small brick cottages were primarily built in the period immediately following World War II. The surviving historic buildings illustrate the forms and styles of buildings typically constructed in working-class suburban communities of the period.

It was listed on the National Register of Historic Places in 2003.
