= Vansville, Maryland =

Unincorporated community in Maryland, United States

Vansville
- Unincorporated community
- Location within the state of Maryland Vansville (the United States)
- Coordinates: 39°2′36″N 76°53′44″W
- Country: United States of America
- State: Maryland
- County: Prince George's
- Time zone: UTC-5 (Eastern (EST))
  - Summer (DST): UTC-4 (EDT)
- GNIS feature ID: 598210

Vansville is an unincorporated community in Prince George's County, Maryland, United States. For statistical purposes, it is part of the Beltsville census-designated place (CDP).

Vansville is named after the Van Horne family, who operated a tavern along the post road (U.S. Route 1).
