= Stateroom (surveillance program) =

Signals intelligence collection program

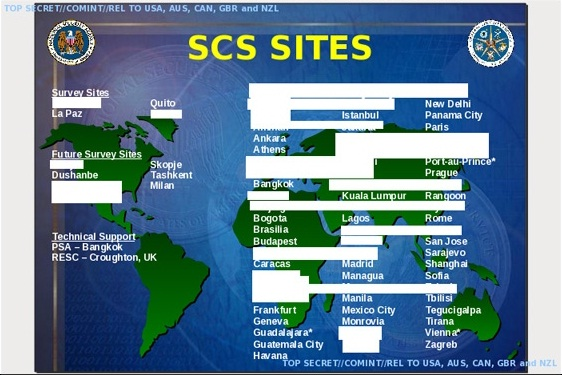
Locations of the U.S. Special Collection Service (SCS) eavesdropping sites in 2004

STATEROOM is the code name of a clandestine program for signals intelligence of international radio, telecommunications and Internet traffic. It is operated out of the diplomatic missions of the signatories to the UKUSA Agreement and the members of the ECHELON network including Australia, New Zealand, United Kingdom, Canada and the United States.

In almost 100 U.S. embassies and consulates worldwide, Stateroom operations are conducted by the Special Collection Service (SCS), a unit that is jointly operated by the Central Intelligence Agency (CIA) and the National Security Agency (NSA).

According to the Snowden disclosures, the true mission of Stateroom personnel is generally not revealed to the rest of the diplomatic staff at the facilities where they are assigned.

== Members ==
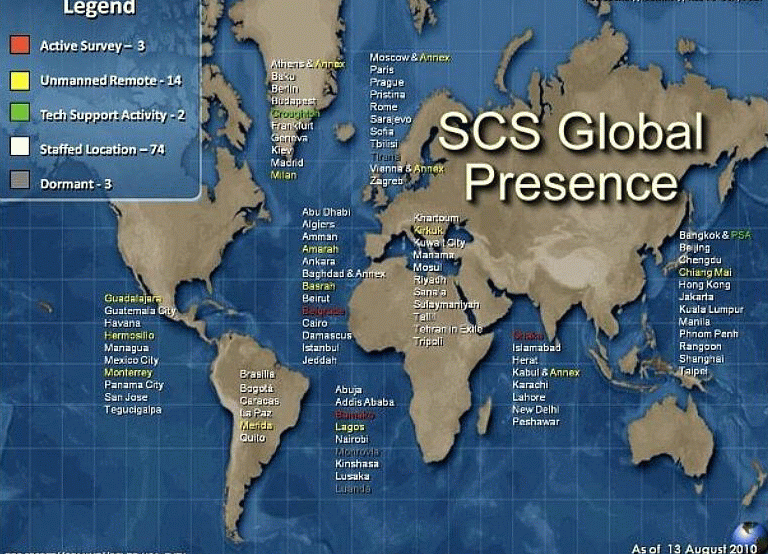
Location and status of CIA/NSA Special Collection Service (SCS) eavesdropping sites as of 13 August 2010

- (Australia) – Australian Signals Directorate (ASD), formerly known as the Defence Signals Directorate (DSD)
- (Canada) – Communications Security Establishment (CSE)
- (United Kingdom) – Government Communications Headquarters (GCHQ)
- (United States) – Special Collection Service (SCS)
- (New Zealand) – Government Communications Security Bureau (GCSB)

== Operations ==
Note: The list of locations in the following section is non-exhaustive, and only includes publicly disclosed information.

=== Australia ===
The collection of signals intelligence by Australian embassies and high commissions occurs in capital cities across East Asia and Southeast Asia, namely: Bangkok (Thailand), Beijing (China), Dili (East Timor), Hanoi (Vietnam), Jakarta (Indonesia), Kuala Lumpur (Malaysia), Port Moresby (Papua New Guinea)

=== Canada ===
In the 1980s, surveys were conducted by Canada's CSE agency to pick out Canadian embassies suitable to function as surveillance posts.

=== New Zealand ===
As of 16 March 2015, New Zealand's GCSB agency had a secret listening post, codenamed "Caprica", at the New Zealand High Commission in Honiara, the capital of the Solomon Islands. The "Caprica" outpost was reportedly modeled after the NSA's Stateroom outposts at selected United States embassies across the world.

=== United Kingdom ===
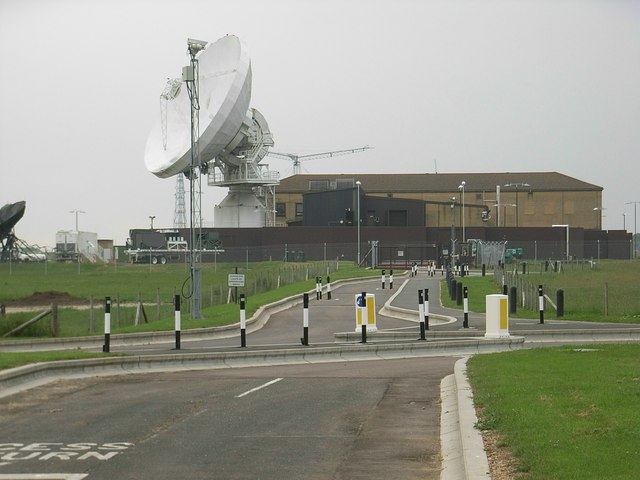
RAF Croughton in Northamptonshire, England

As of 2013, British embassies and consulates in the following capital cities are known to contain clandestine surveillance facilities:

- Berlin (Germany)

Data collected by Britain is sent to a relay facility at RAF Croughton in Northamptonshire, England, before being transmitted to a data center jointly operated by the U.S. Central Intelligence Agency and the U.S. National Security Agency in College Park, Maryland.

=== United States ===
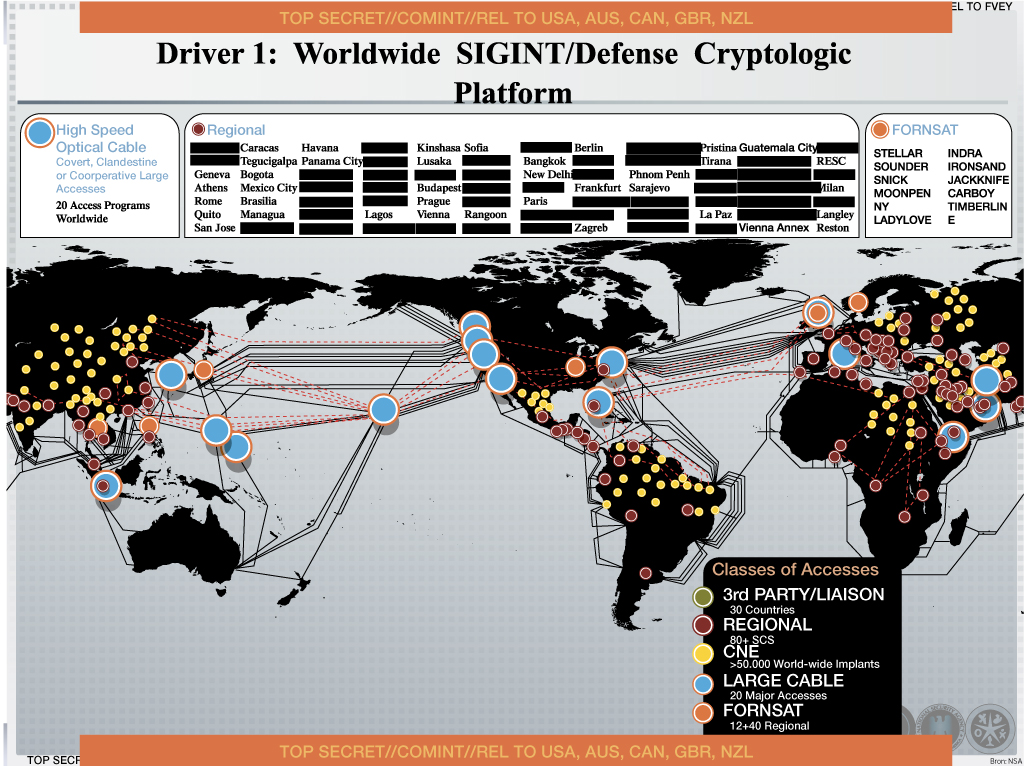
On 23 November 2013, the Dutch newspaper NRC Handelsblad released a top secret NSA presentation leaked by Snowden that shows, among others, locations of the U.S. Special Collection Service (SCS).

In the United States, the U.S. Special Collection Service (SCS) contributes to Stateroom. The SCS is jointly operated by the Central Intelligence Agency (CIA) and the National Security Agency (NSA). On 23 November 2013, the Dutch newspaper NRC Handelsblad released a top secret NSA presentation leaked by Edward Snowden, which shows the presence of SCS operations in numerous U.S. diplomatic missions located in the following cities: Athens (Greece), Bangkok (Thailand), Berlin (Germany), Brasília (Brazil), Budapest (Hungary), Frankfurt (Germany), Geneva (Switzerland), Lagos (Nigeria), Milan (Italy), New Delhi (India), Paris (France), Prague (Czech Republic), Vienna (Austria), Zagreb (Croatia).

In October 2013, reports by former NSA contractor Edward Snowden led to the revelation of the SCS having systematically wiretapped Chancellor of Germany Angela Merkel's private cell phone over a period of over 10 years, among other activities to wiretap and systematically record large amounts of European and South American leaders' and citizens' communications.

Other SCS locations include Baku (Azerbaijan), Kyiv (Ukraine), Madrid (Spain), Moscow (Russia), Pristina (Serbia), Rome (Italy), Sarajevo (Bosnia), Tbilisi (Georgia), and Tirana (Albania).

== Public revelation ==
The existence of Stateroom was revealed in October 2013 in the Snowden disclosures.

...These sites are small in size and in number of personnel staffing them. They are covert, and their true mission is not known by the majority of the diplomatic staff at the facility where they are assigned.

— Excerpt from the NSA's STATEROOM Guide

== Reactions ==
=== New Zealand ===
Damien Rogers, former senior adviser to the New Zealand intelligence agency Government Communications Security Bureau (GCSB) said he was surprised to hear that the "Stateroom" codeword and location of associated sites are being published in the media, because such revelations would cause "anxiety and concern" for the directors of the five intelligence agencies of the UKUSA Agreement. Nicky Hager, a New Zealand investigative journalist who exposed the ECHELON surveillance system, confirmed that such surveillance operations have been conducted by the intelligence agencies of the Five Eyes for quite some time.

=== Australia ===
A spokesman for Australia's Department of Foreign Affairs and Trade said: "It is the long-standing practice of Australian governments not to comment on intelligence matters." Australian Prime Minister Tony Abbott told reporters that "Every Australian governmental agency, every Australian official at home and abroad operates in accordance with the law, and that's the assurance that I can give people at home and abroad".

=== Canada ===
Government representatives at CSE declined to comment directly on the leak. A spokeswoman for Canada's Defence Minister Rob Nicholson declined to comment.

=== China ===
Hua Chunying, a spokeswoman for China's Foreign Ministry, reacted angrily and demanded that foreign entities and personnel in China "strictly abide" by the Vienna Convention on Diplomatic Relations, the Vienna Convention on Consular Relations and other international treaties.

=== Germany ===
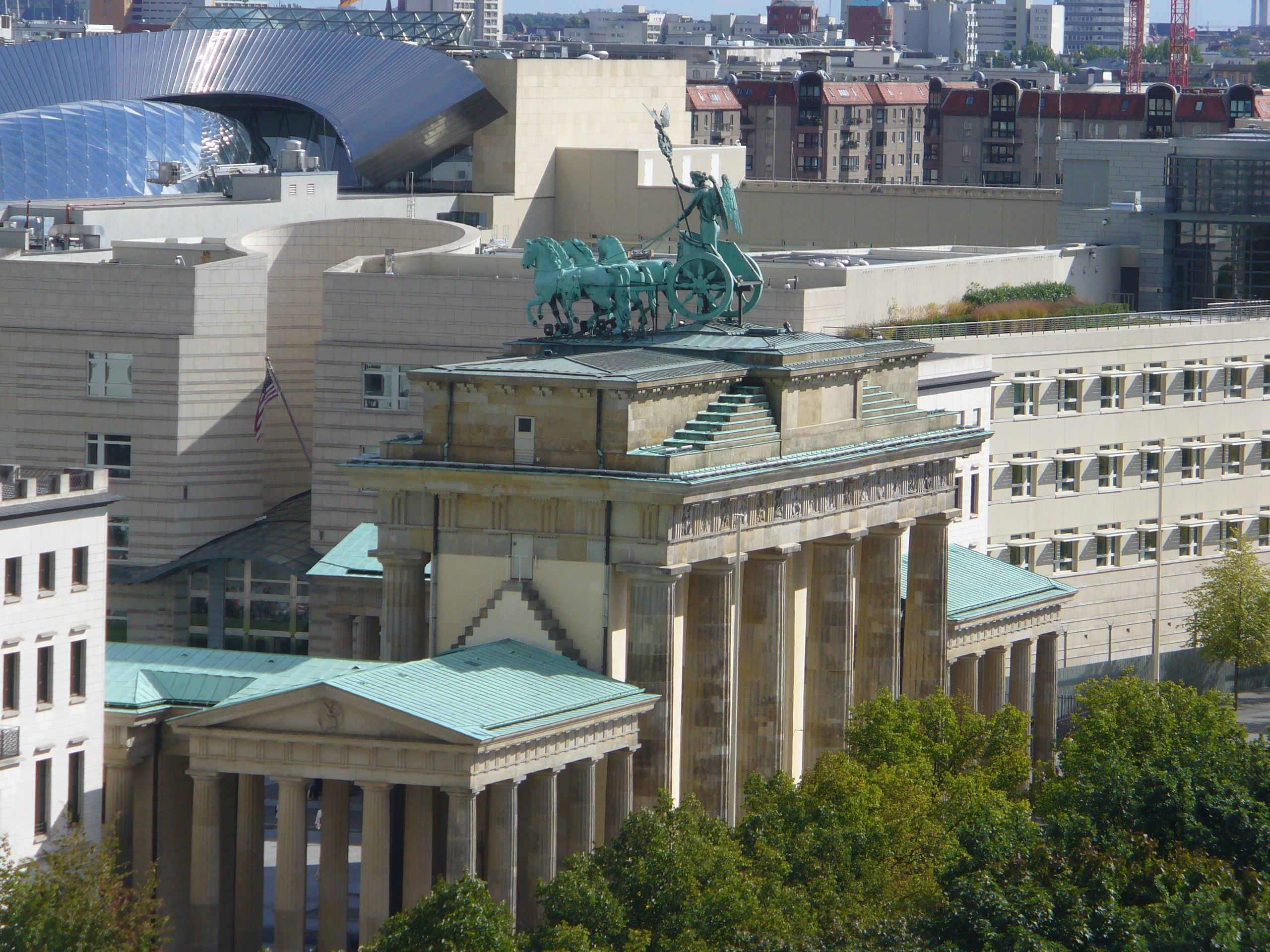
A view from the rooftop terrace of the Reichstag building in Berlin, the seat of the German parliament. In the background, behind the Brandenburg Gate, the United States Embassy can be seen. The grey structure on the embassy's roof (top right corner of the photograph) is thought to contain surveillance equipment, possibly used to tap into mobile phones.

German Foreign Minister Guido Westerwelle summoned Britain's Ambassador to Germany, Simon McDonald, to explain and to clarify the presence of Britain's eavesdropping centre in Berlin.

=== Indonesia ===
Indonesian Foreign Minister Marty Natalegawa protested against the surveillance program, and told the media that "such action is not only a breach of security, but also a serious violation of diplomatic norms and ethics, and certainly not in tune with the spirit of friendly relations between nations."

=== Malaysia ===
Malaysia's Minister of Home Affairs, Ahmad Zahid Hamidi, said that Snowden's revelation is a "sensitive issue since it involves several countries".

=== Solomon Islands ===
The Solomon Islands' Chief of Staff, Robert Iroga, said that the New Zealand Government's actions damaged New Zealand's image as a "friendly government" in the South Pacific. He added that communications within the inner circle of the Solomons Government was "highly secret information" that rightfully belong to the Solomon Islanders. In addition, Iroga accused New Zealand officials of bullying-behavior in trade negotiations and alleged that New Zealand had shared information regarding Taiwanese aid money with China.

=== Thailand ===
Thailand's National Security Council asserted that such forms of surveillance are considered to be acts of criminality under the Law of Thailand.

== Gallery ==
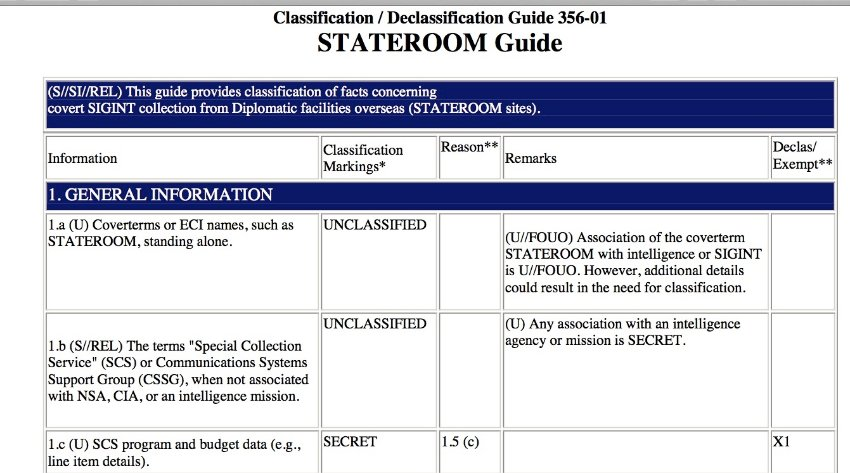
Guide to STATEROOM leaked by Edward Snowden.

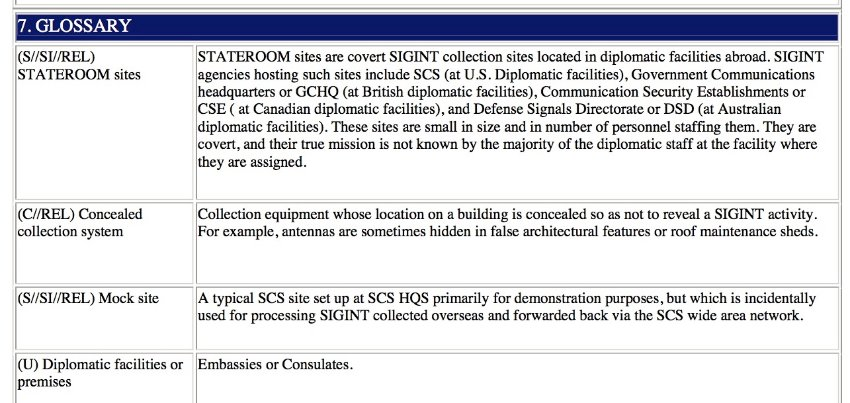
Glossary of related terms, as defined by the NSA

== See also ==
- Global surveillance
- List of government surveillance projects
- Mass surveillance
  - Mass surveillance in the United Kingdom
  - Mass surveillance in the United States
