= Beltsville, Maryland =

- CDP
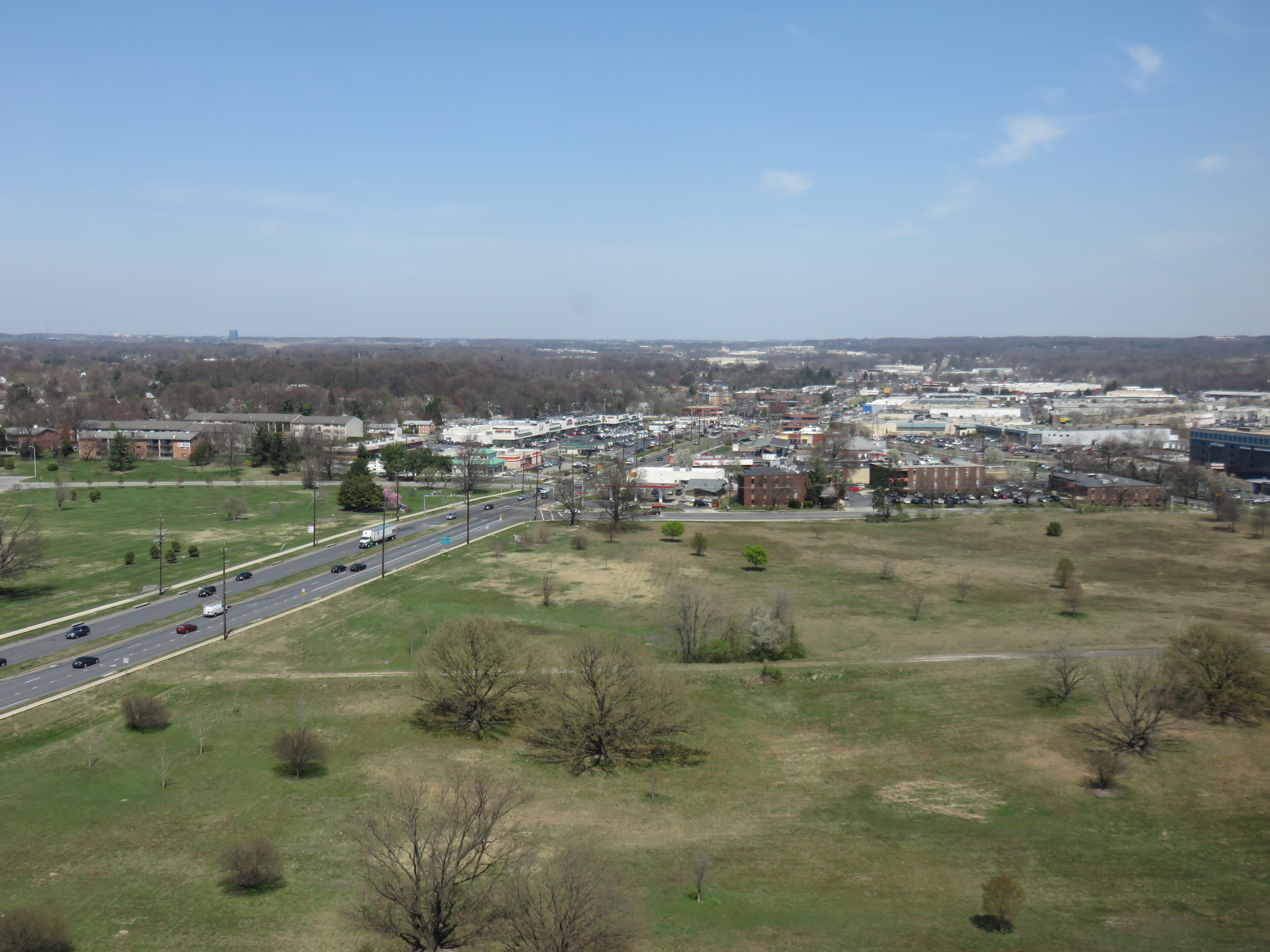
- Downtown Beltsville viewed from the top floor of the National Agricultural Library

- Location of Beltsville, Maryland
- Coordinates: 39°2′15″N 76°55′4″W
- Country: United States
- State: Maryland
- County: Prince George's

Area
  - Total: 7.23 sq mi (18.73 km^{2})
  - Land: 7.20 sq mi (18.66 km^{2})
  - Water: 0.027 sq mi (0.07 km^{2})
- Elevation: 135 ft (41 m)

Population (2020)
  - Total: 20,133
  - Density: 2,793.9/sq mi (1,078.75/km^{2})
- Time zone: UTC−5 (Eastern (EST))
  - Summer (DST): UTC−4 (EDT)
- ZIP codes: 20704-20705
- Area codes: 301, 240
- FIPS code: 24-06400
- GNIS feature ID: 0597069
- Website: www.beltsville.com

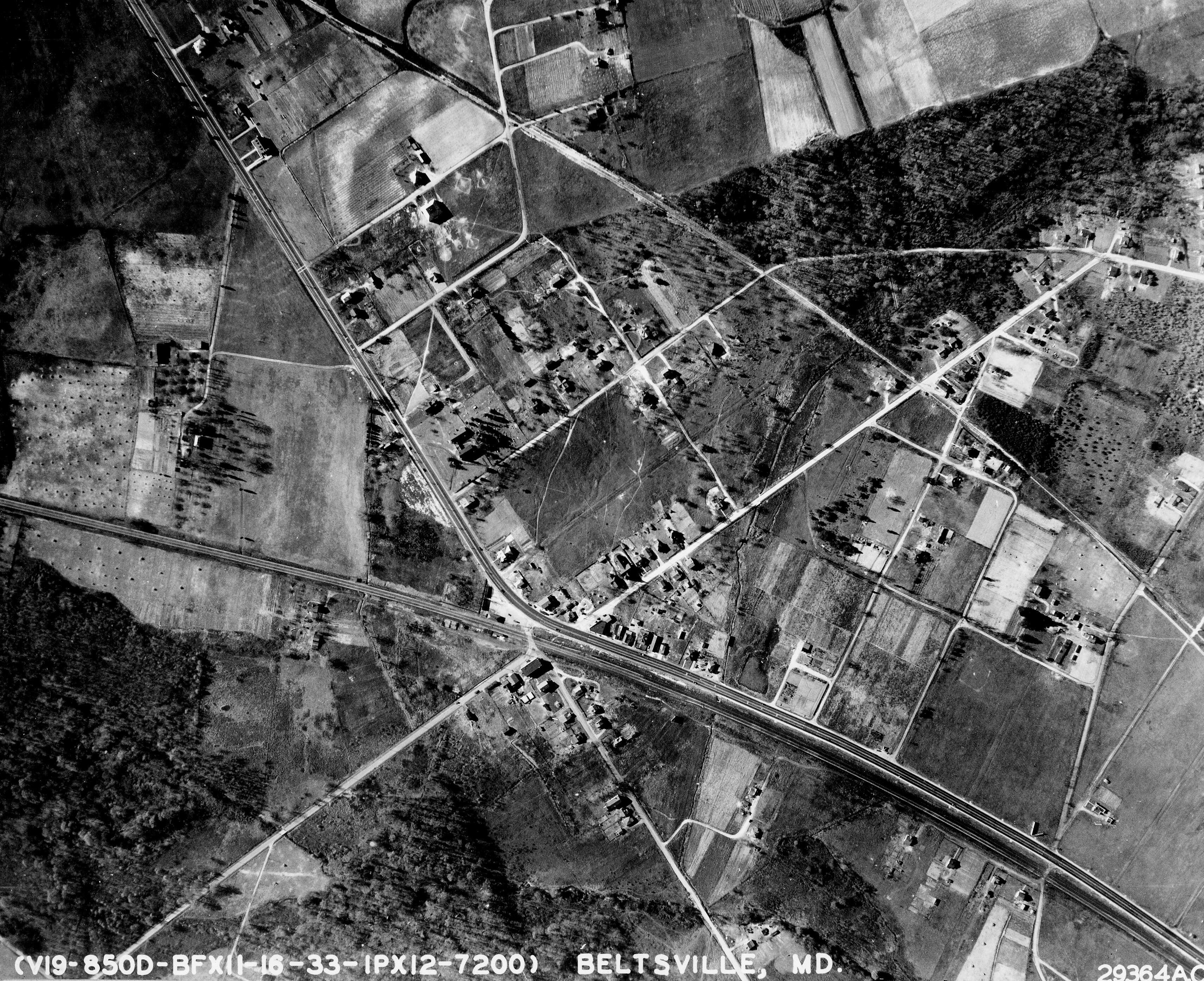
Aerial view of Beltsville, 1943

Beltsville is a census-designated place (CDP) in northern Prince George's County, Maryland, United States. The community was named for Truman Belt, a local landowner. The 2020 census counted 20,133 residents. Beltsville includes the unincorporated community of Vansville.

== Geography ==
Beltsville is adjacent to the Montgomery County – Prince George's County line. It is approximately 7 miles (11 km) northeast of the Maryland border with Washington.

According to the United States Census Bureau, Beltsville has a total area of 7.2 square miles (18.6 km^{2}), of which 7.1 square miles (18.5 km^{2}) is land and 0.04 square miles (0.1 km^{2}), or 0.38%, is water.

=== Climate ===
The climate in this area is characterized by hot, humid summers (up to 30.6°C or 87.1°F) and generally mild to cool winters (as low as -3.7°C or 25.3°F). According to the Köppen Climate Classification system, Beltsville has a humid subtropical climate, abbreviated "Cfa" on climate maps.

Climate data for Beltsville, Maryland (1991–2020 normals, extremes 1941–present)
Month	Jan	Feb	Mar	Apr	May	Jun	Jul	Aug	Sep	Oct	Nov	Dec	Year
Record high °F (°C)	78 (26)	79 (26)	88 (31)	94 (34)	96 (36)	100 (38)	103 (39)	102 (39)	101 (38)	98 (37)	85 (29)	83 (28)	103 (39)
Mean maximum °F (°C)	65.6 (18.7)	66.8 (19.3)	75.5 (24.2)	85.1 (29.5)	89.6 (32.0)	94.5 (34.7)	96.4 (35.8)	95.2 (35.1)	90.8 (32.7)	83.9 (28.8)	74.9 (23.8)	65.8 (18.8)	97.6 (36.4)
Mean daily maximum °F (°C)	42.7 (5.9)	45.5 (7.5)	53.4 (11.9)	65.3 (18.5)	74.2 (23.4)	83.0 (28.3)	87.1 (30.6)	85.6 (29.8)	79.2 (26.2)	67.8 (19.9)	56.7 (13.7)	46.8 (8.2)	65.6 (18.7)
Daily mean °F (°C)	34.0 (1.1)	36.3 (2.4)	43.7 (6.5)	54.5 (12.5)	63.9 (17.7)	73.0 (22.8)	77.4 (25.2)	75.8 (24.3)	69.3 (20.7)	57.3 (14.1)	46.7 (8.2)	38.3 (3.5)	55.9 (13.3)
Mean daily minimum °F (°C)	25.3 (−3.7)	27.0 (−2.8)	34.1 (1.2)	43.8 (6.6)	53.6 (12.0)	63.0 (17.2)	67.6 (19.8)	66.1 (18.9)	59.4 (15.2)	46.8 (8.2)	36.7 (2.6)	29.8 (−1.2)	46.1 (7.8)
Mean minimum °F (°C)	9.2 (−12.7)	12.0 (−11.1)	18.6 (−7.4)	29.2 (−1.6)	38.3 (3.5)	49.2 (9.6)	57.2 (14.0)	55.4 (13.0)	44.5 (6.9)	32.2 (0.1)	23.2 (−4.9)	15.6 (−9.1)	7.1 (−13.8)
Record low °F (°C)	−15 (−26)	−12 (−24)	−1 (−18)	15 (−9)	26 (−3)	37 (3)	45 (7)	38 (3)	29 (−2)	20 (−7)	12 (−11)	−6 (−21)	−15 (−26)
Average precipitation inches (mm)	2.87 (73)	2.40 (61)	3.72 (94)	3.28 (83)	4.27 (108)	4.23 (107)	4.51 (115)	3.88 (99)	4.42 (112)	4.04 (103)	2.92 (74)	3.48 (88)	44.02 (1,118)
Average snowfall inches (cm)	5.7 (14)	5.0 (13)	2.5 (6.4)	0.1 (0.25)	0.0 (0.0)	0.0 (0.0)	0.0 (0.0)	0.0 (0.0)	0.0 (0.0)	0.0 (0.0)	0.2 (0.51)	2.3 (5.8)	15.8 (40)
Average precipitation days (≥ 0.01 in)	10.0	8.9	10.2	10.8	10.9	10.3	10.1	9.2	8.6	9.0	8.2	9.8	116.0
Average snowy days (≥ 0.1 in)	2.5	2.2	1.2	0.1	0.0	0.0	0.0	0.0	0.0	0.0	0.2	1.4	7.6
Source: NOAA

== Demographics ==
Historical population
Census	Pop.	Note	%±
2000	15,690		—
2010	16,772		6.9%
2020	20,133		20.0%
U.S. Decennial Census; 2010 2020

=== Racial and ethnic composition ===
Beltsville CDP, Maryland – Racial and ethnic composition Note: the US Census treats Hispanic/Latino as an ethnic category. This table excludes Latinos from the racial categories and assigns them to a separate category. Hispanics/Latinos may be of any race.
Race / Ethnicity (NH = Non-Hispanic)	Pop 2000	Pop 2010	Pop 2020	% 2000	% 2010	% 2020
White alone (NH)	7,001	4,508	4,268	44.62%	26.88%	21.20%
Black or African American alone (NH)	4,938	5,631	5,391	31.47%	33.57%	26.78%
Native American or Alaska Native alone (NH)	29	34	37	0.18%	0.20%	0.18%
Asian alone (NH)	1,681	1,582	1,646	10.71%	9.43%	8.18%
Native Hawaiian or Pacific Islander alone (NH)	16	7	6	0.10%	0.04%	0.03%
Other race alone (NH)	68	81	148	0.43%	0.48%	0.74%
Mixed race or Multiracial (NH)	413	390	514	2.63%	2.33%	2.55%
Hispanic or Latino (any race)	1,544	4,539	8,123	9.84%	27.06%	40.35%
Total	15,690	16,772	20,133	100.00%	100.00%	100.00%

=== 2020 census ===
As of the 2020 census, Beltsville had a population of 20,133. The median age was 39.0 years. 22.2% of residents were under the age of 18 and 20.0% of residents were 65 years of age or older. For every 100 females there were 92.8 males, and for every 100 females age 18 and over there were 89.2 males age 18 and over.

99.9% of residents lived in urban areas, while 0.1% lived in rural areas.

There were 6,718 households in Beltsville, of which 33.3% had children under the age of 18 living in them. Of all households, 41.9% were married-couple households, 19.2% were households with a male householder and no spouse or partner present, and 33.7% were households with a female householder and no spouse or partner present. About 29.3% of all households were made up of individuals and 19.2% had someone living alone who was 65 years of age or older.

There were 7,105 housing units, of which 5.4% were vacant. The homeowner vacancy rate was 1.3% and the rental vacancy rate was 6.4%.

Racial composition as of the 2020 census
Race	Number	Percent
White	4,816	23.9%
Black or African American	5,564	27.6%
American Indian and Alaska Native	264	1.3%
Asian	1,649	8.2%
Native Hawaiian and Other Pacific Islander	18	0.1%
Some other race	5,637	28.0%
Two or more races	2,185	10.9%

=== 2000 census ===
As of the census of 2000, there were 15,690 people, 5,690 households, and 3,823 families residing in Beltsville. The population density was 2,366.9 inhabitants per square mile (913.9/km^{2}). There were 5,865 housing units at an average density of 884.8 per square mile (341.6/km^{2}). The racial makeup of Beltsville was 48.20% White, 31.96% African American, 0.26% Native American, 10.75% Asian, 0.10% Pacific Islander, 5.42% from other races, and 3.31% from two or more races. Hispanic or Latino of any race were 9.84% of the population.

There were 5,690 households, out of which 32.4% had children under the age of 18 living with them, 49.0% were married couples living together, 13.5% had a female householder with no husband present, and 32.8% were non-families. 23.0% of all households were made up of individuals, and 5.1% had someone living alone who was 65 years of age or older. The average household size was 2.74 and the average family size was 3.27.

In Beltsville the population was spread out, with 23.6% under the age of 18, 10.3% from 18 to 24, 34.5% from 25 to 44, 22.6% from 45 to 64, and 8.9% who were 65 years of age or older. The median age was 35 years. For every 100 females, there were 94.5 males. For every 100 females age 18 and over, there were 91.8 males.

The median income for a household in Beltsville was $57,722, and the median income for a family was $66,087. Males had a median income of $40,914 with $35,645 for females. The per capita income for the CDP was $24,679. About 5.5% of families and 7.2% of the population were below the poverty line, including 5.4% of those under age 18 and 7.2% of those age 65 or over.

== History ==
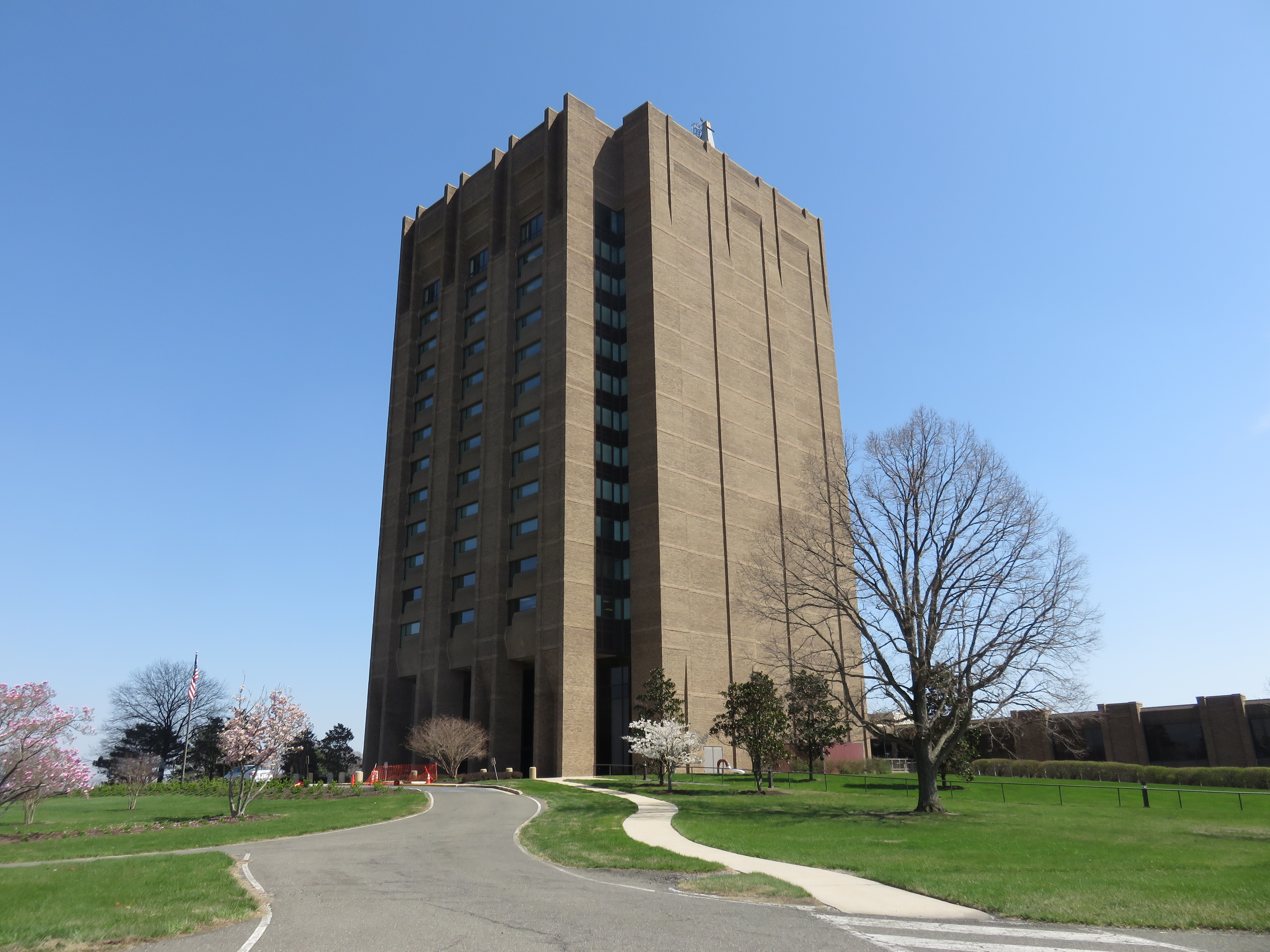
The National Agricultural Library in 2018

Beltsville's history dates back to 1649, when the land was part of an 80,000-acre (324 km^{2}) land grant given to Richard Snowden I by Lord Baltimore of England. Snowden and his family were planters who established large plantations on which they built comfortable manor homes. Soon after, other settlers moved into the area, but they were farmers who could only afford a few acres of land and whose families lived in small cabins. The principal crop was tobacco, most of which was shipped to England. Because of the fertile soil and desirable growing conditions, the crops prospered.

Industry came to Beltsville in the early 18th century when iron ore was discovered in the area. The Muirkirk Iron Furnace on US 1 was established by Andrew and Elias Elliott, who learned their iron-making skills in Muirkirk, Scotland. They produced some of the best-quality pig iron in the country and supplied the U.S. Army with cannons, shot, wheels, and other iron products during the Revolutionary War and the Civil War.

By 1730, Post Road (now part of US 1) was the main thoroughfare through Beltsville. Though crude, it made stagecoach travel possible. In 1783, Gabriel Peterson Van Horn established a stage line and built the Van Horn Tavern on Odell Road, where passengers could spend the night as they traveled between Baltimore and Washington. The trip took one and one-half days.

Beltsville has a distinguished Revolutionary War hero as its native son. Brigadier General Rezin Beall, who was born on Turkey Flight Plantation on Old Gunpowder Road in 1723, prevented a British invasion at Drum Point on the Chesapeake Bay with only 100 men. He is credited with the fact that there are no Revolutionary War battlefields in Maryland.

In 1835 one of the first rail lines in the country, the Washington branch of the B&O Railroad (Baltimore & Ohio), was built through Prince George's County. Coming from Baltimore, the line entered the county at Laurel and ran southwesterly to Bladensburg, then into Washington. B&O established a rail stop and freight depot on land purchased from a tobacco farmer named Trueman Belt, and they named the place after him. The new community of Beltsville was doubly blessed, for the Baltimore-Washington Turnpike crossed the rail line there. It soon became a thriving little trading center, eclipsing the older community of Vansville further north on the pike.

The original area developed haphazardly and consisted of a few residences, two churches, several small stores, a blacksmith, and a wheelwright. In 1891, the Beltsville Land Improvement Company was chartered and over the next thirty years developed the South Beltsville subdivision as a grid of streets. The developers sold the lots to individual owners and placed restrictive covenants on the deeds, including forbidding the manufacture or sale of alcohol and the sale of any property to an African American. Beltsville was marketed to professionals who wanted to escape the congestion of Washington and was developed with a mixture of Victorian-style houses and Colonial Revival houses. The community grew further when an electric railway was extended to Beltsville. The railway began as the Berwyn and Laurel Electric Railroad, but after suffering from financial difficulties it was acquired by the City and Suburban Railway. Located to the west of the railroad, along the line of present-day Rhode Island Avenue, the streetcar line served as the nucleus for additional subdivisions. These areas continued to develop slowly throughout the 1930s and 1940s with the construction of modest side-gable residences. Development continued after the introduction of the automobile, but it was not until after World War II that intensive development came to the Beltsville area.

As the federal government grew, in 1910 the U.S. Department of Agriculture (USDA) began to purchase land in Beltsville for its Agricultural Research Service, the main in-house research arm of the USDA. The land now houses the Henry A. Wallace Beltsville Agricultural Research Center (BARC). The first parcel acquired was 375 acres (1.5 km^{2}) of the Walnut Grange Plantation with its historic "Butterfly House". The Center eventually encompassed 14,600 acres (59 km^{2}) and became the largest and most prominent center of agricultural science research in the world.

There are a number of historic homes and buildings still standing in Beltsville. The oldest home was built in 1773. One of the largest of the older buildings, built in 1880, was the three-story Ammendale Normal Institute, which was destroyed by fire in 1998.

In 2003 Kevin Kennedy started a group which aimed to have Beltsville incorporate into its own municipality. By 2004 the 12-member group, named Committee to Incorporate Beltsville, advocated for getting the issue on the ballot. By late 2004 the group began efforts to collect 3,000 signatures on a petition so the issue can be put up for election; this would represent about one quarter of the persons in Beltsville who were registered to vote. By the deadline in March 2005 they failed to get sufficient signatures as they only had 2,000.

=== Historic sites ===
The following is a list of historic sites in Beltsville and identified by the Maryland-National Capital Park and Planning Commission: African-American Heritage Sites at nearby Rossville are listed at Muirkirk, Maryland.

	Site Name	Image	Location	M-NCPPC Inventory Number	Comment
1	Abraham Hall		7612 Old Muirkirk Rd.	62-023-07	Located at Rossville. Listed on the National Register of Historic Places, 2005-03-14
2	Ammendale Normal Institute		Jct. of Ammendale Rd. and U.S. 1	60-004	Listed on the National Register of Historic Places, 1975-04-14; demolished 2006
3	Briarley Academy (Old Hotel)		11777 Old Baltimore Pike	62-010	
4	Orme-Shaw House		11601 Caverly Avenue	61-002	
5	McLeod House		11034 Montgomery Road	61-011	
6	Dr. Charles Fox House (Coffin House)		4931 Powder Mill Road	61-007	
7	Sellman House		Building 023, Beltsville Agricultural Research Center West	61-012	
8	St. John’s Episcopal Church		11040 Baltimore Avenue	61-009	
9	St. Joseph’s Catholic Chapel		6011 Ammendale Road	60-007	Listed on the National Register of Historic Places with Ammendale Normal Institute, 1975-04-14
10	Walnut Grange		Powder Mill Road (Building 209), Beltsville Agricultural Research Center	62-013	

== Government ==
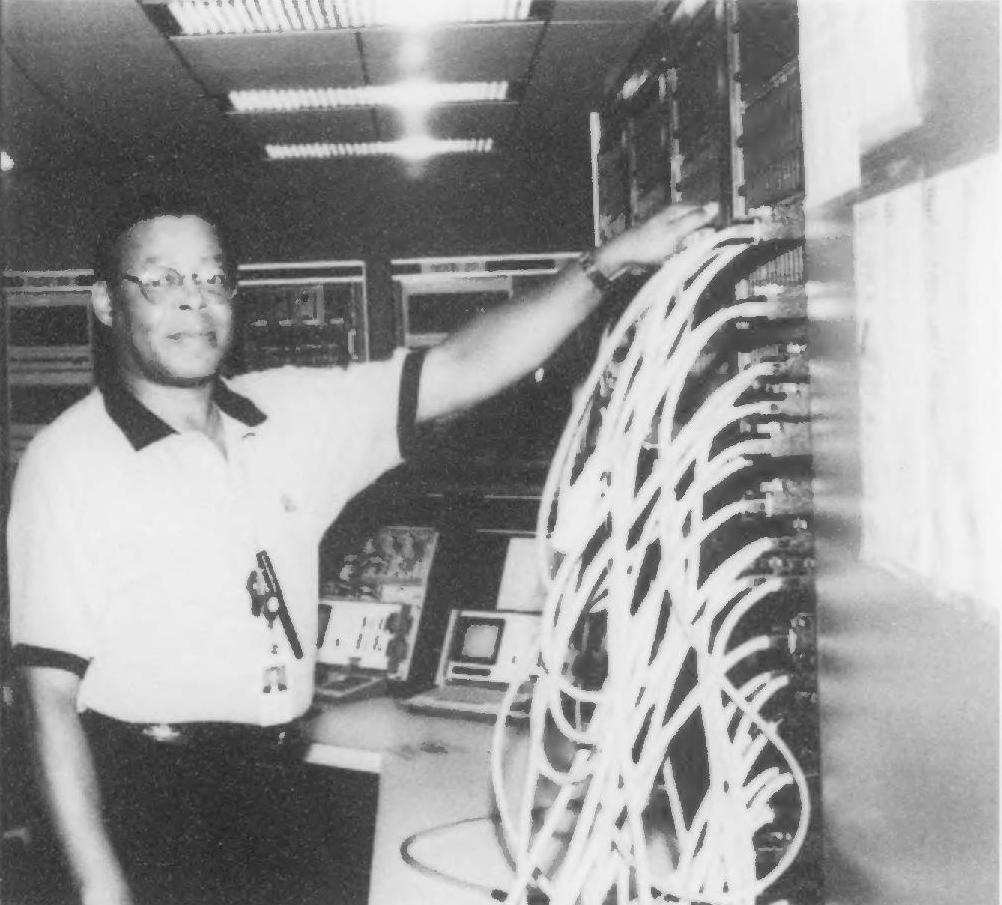
Equipment at the Beltsville Information Management Center in 1998

Prince George's County Police Department District 6 Station in Beltsville serves the community.

The U.S. Postal Service operates the Beltsville Post Office.

The Department of State operates the Beltsville Information Management Center.

The United States Secret Service James J. Rowley Training Center is nicknamed “Beltsville” but is located in nearby South Laurel.

== Education ==
=== Schools ===
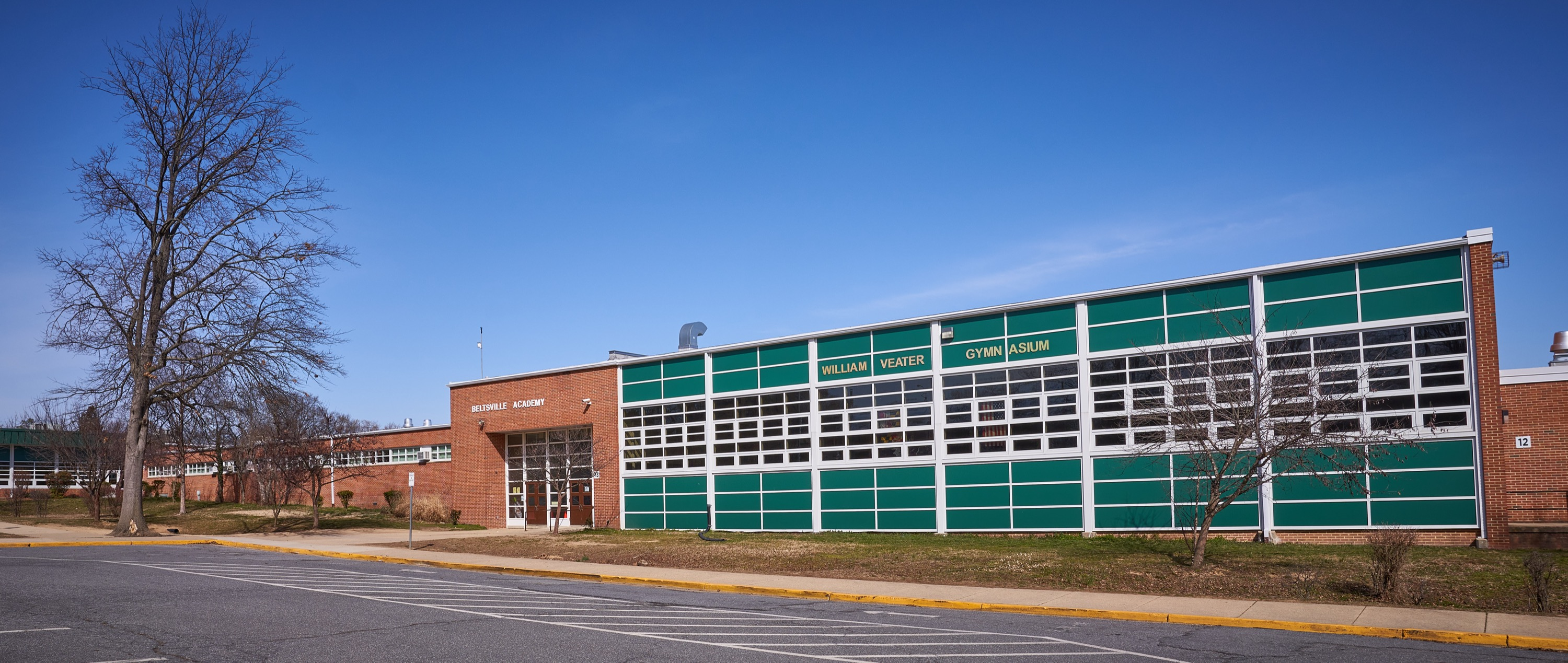
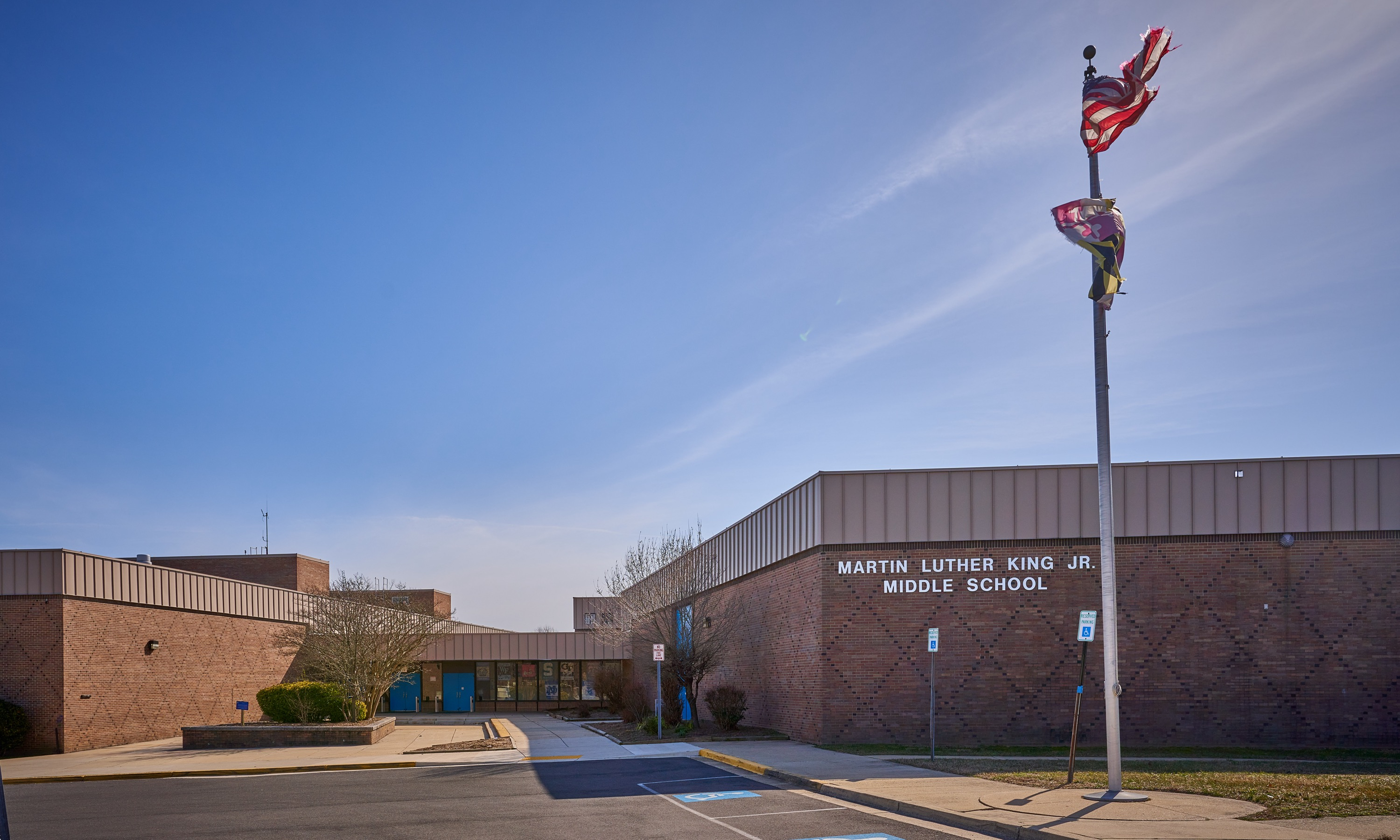
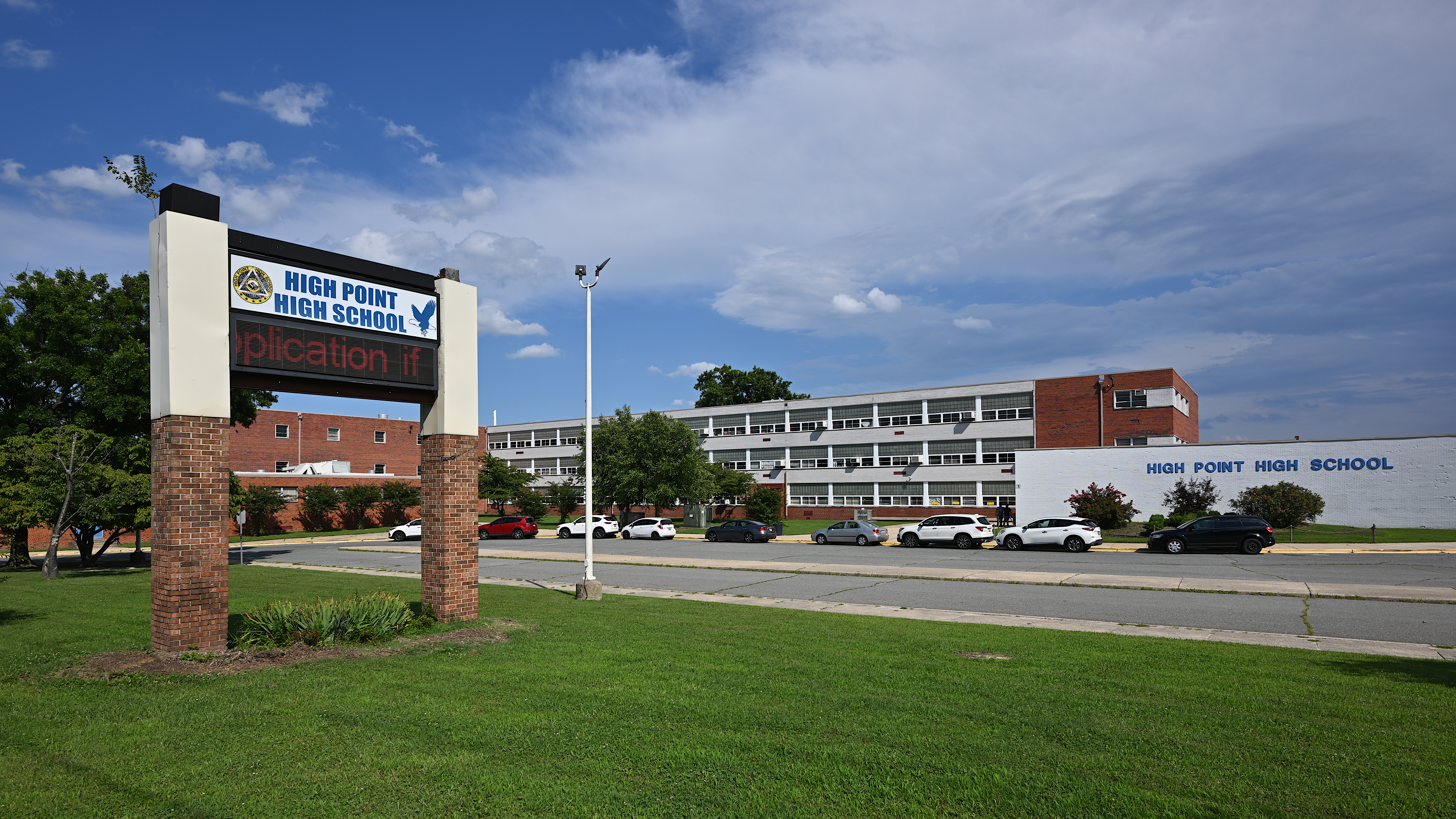
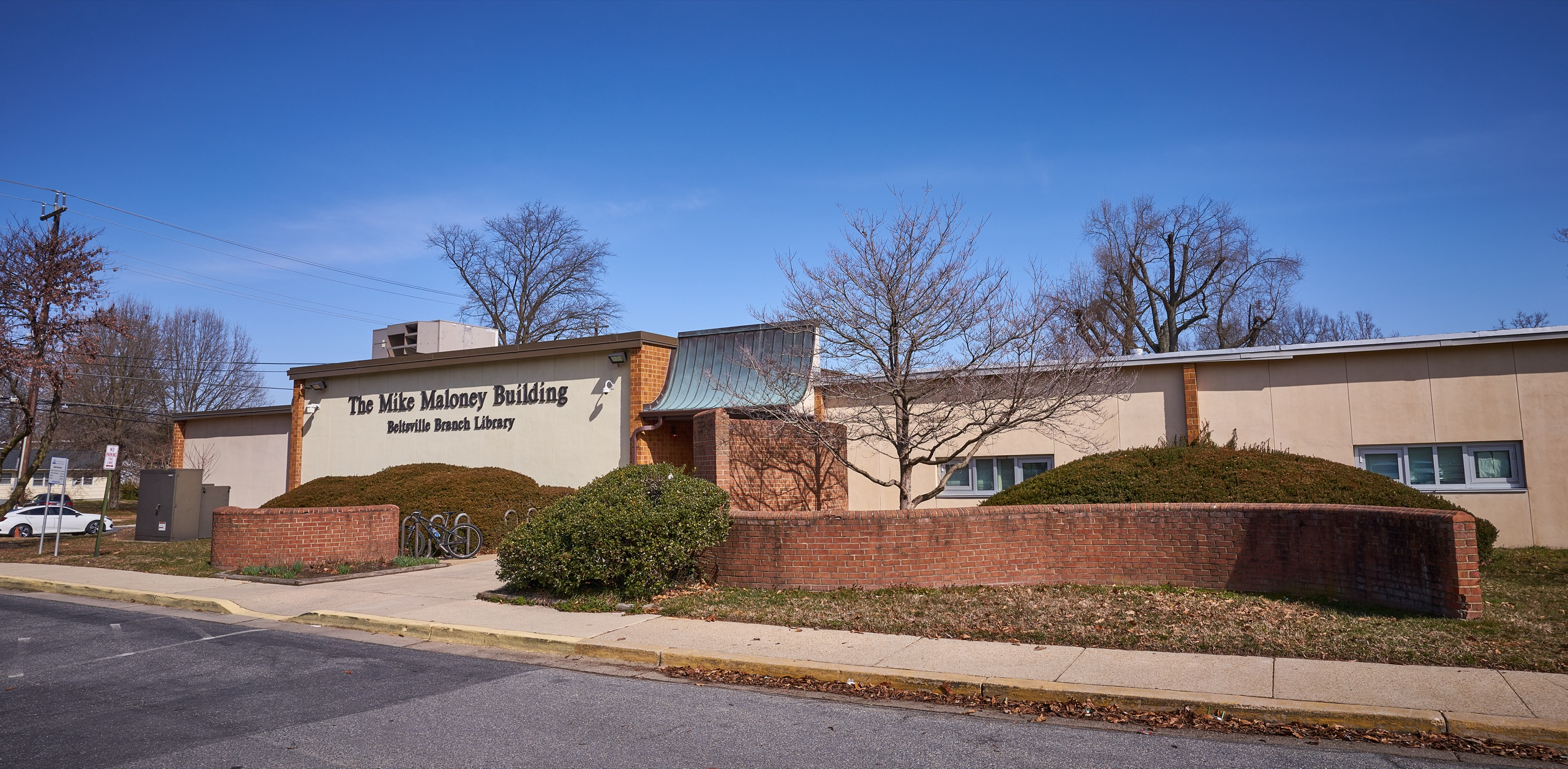
From top to bottom: Beltsville Academy, Martin Luther King Middle School, High Point High School, and Beltsville Branch Library

Public elementary schools include:

- Beltsville Academy (K-8, formerly Beltsville Elementary School) on Wicomico Avenue
- Calverton Elementary School on Beltsville Road in Calverton CDP
- Vansville Elementary School (adjacent to the Beltsville CDP) on Ammendale Road

Public middle schools include:

- Beltsville Academy on Wicomico Avenue
- Martin Luther King Middle School on Ammendale Road

Public high schools include:

- High Point High School on Powder Mill Road

There are three parochial schools in Beltsville: Augsburg Academy (Lutheran), St Joseph's School (Roman Catholic of the Roman Catholic Diocese of Washington), and Beltsville Seventh-day Adventist (SDA).

During the era of legally-required racial segregation of schools, black students from Beltsville attended Lakeland High School in College Park in the period 1928-1950; Fairmont Heights High School, then near Fairmount Heights, replaced Lakeland High and served black students only from 1950 to 1964; around 1964 legally-required racial segregation of schools ended.

=== Libraries ===
Prince George's County Memorial Library System operates the Beltsville Branch.

== Notable past businesses ==
- Ritz Camera Centers was headquartered in Beltsville. The chain included Ritz Camera, Wolf Camera, Kit's Camera, Inkley's, Cameras West, and The Camera Shop. The company also owned Boater's World Marine Centers, which was headquartered in the same building. The company was acquired in 2012 and the Beltsville headquarters was closed.
- Beltsville Speedway, defunct NASCAR track

== Notable people ==
- Johnny Beall, MLB player
- Matthew Centrowitz Jr., Olympic runner
- Frank Cho, comic book writer and illustrator
- Lyle Goodhue, scientist and inventor
- Cameron Wake, NFL player
- Jameese Joseph, US soccer player

== In popular culture ==
Experimental post-hardcore band Thrice recorded the album The Illusion of Safety here and dedicated a song to the town, named "The Beltsville Crucible".
