= Fairmount Heights Historic District =

Historic district in Maryland, United States

- Fairmont Heights Historic District
- U.S. National Register of Historic Places
- U.S. Historic district
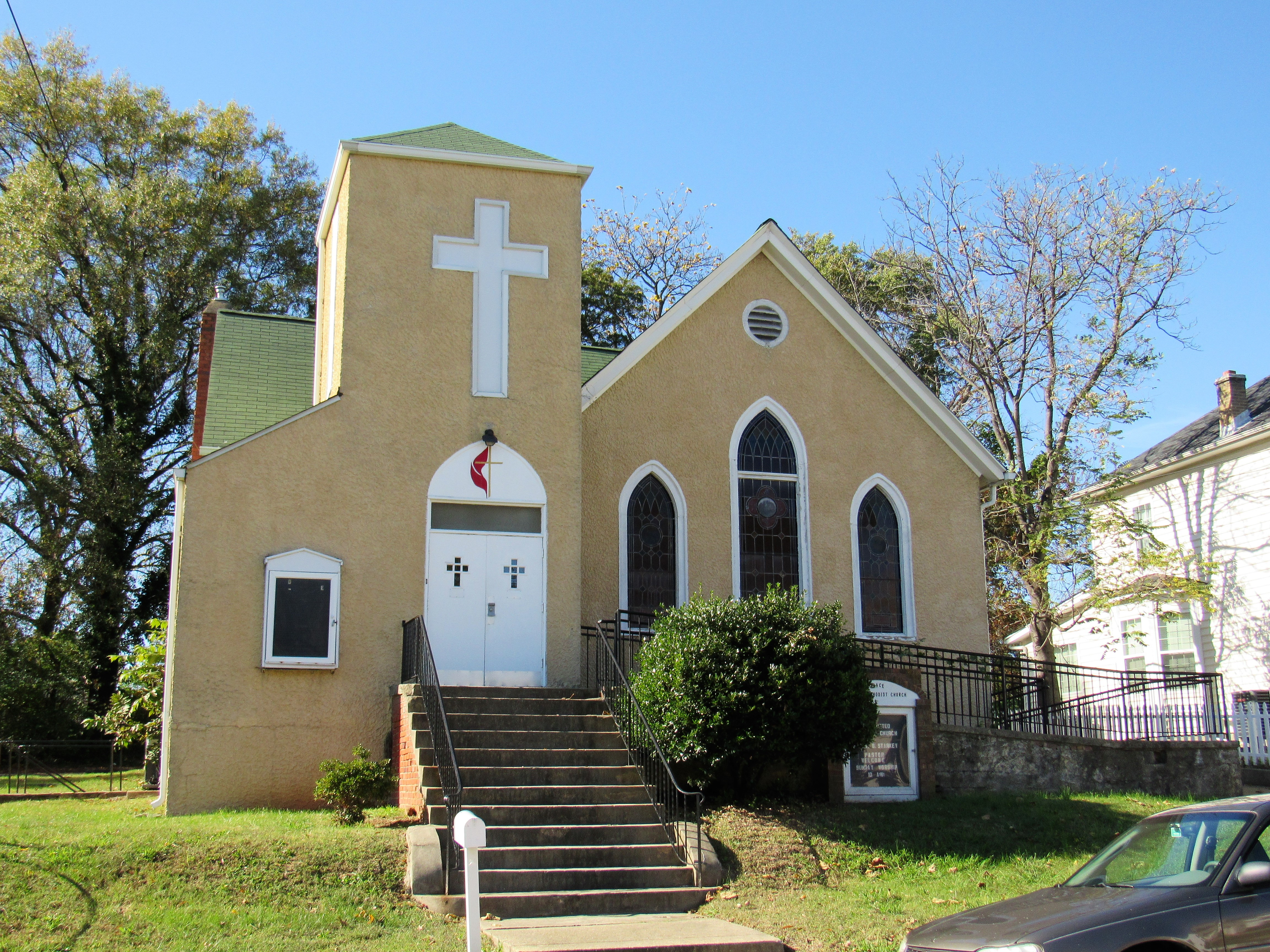
- Grace United Methodist Church

- Location within Maryland Location within the United States
- Location: 56th Ave., Sheriff Rd., Balsamtree Dr., 62nd St. 62nd Pl., Eastern Ave., Fairmount Heights, Maryland
- Coordinates: 38°54′03″N 76°54′56″W
- Area: 144 acres (58 ha)
- Built: 1900
- Architect: W. Sidney Pittman
- Architectural style: Colonial Revival, Tudor, American Foursquare, Bungalow/Craftsman, Minimal Traditional, Ranch
- NRHP reference No.: 11000821
- Added to NRHP: November 18, 2011

The Fairmount Heights Historic District encompasses an area of 144 acres (58 ha) in the historic heart of Fairmount Heights, Maryland. The area is notable as one of the first planned African-American communities in the Washington, D.C., area. Predominantly residential in character, most of its housing stock was built between 1900 and 1960, although there has also been recent development. The district includes the original town hall (built 1908). and the first public school for African-Americans in the county (built 1912). There are also five churches and a community center, all important centers of political activism during the period of segregation.

The district was listed on the National Register of Historic Places in 2011; in the listing it is spelled "Fairmont".

== See also ==
- National Register of Historic Places listings in Prince George's County, Maryland
