= Beltsville Information Management Center =

US Diplomatic Telecommunications Service site

Coordinates: 39.046°N 76.864°W

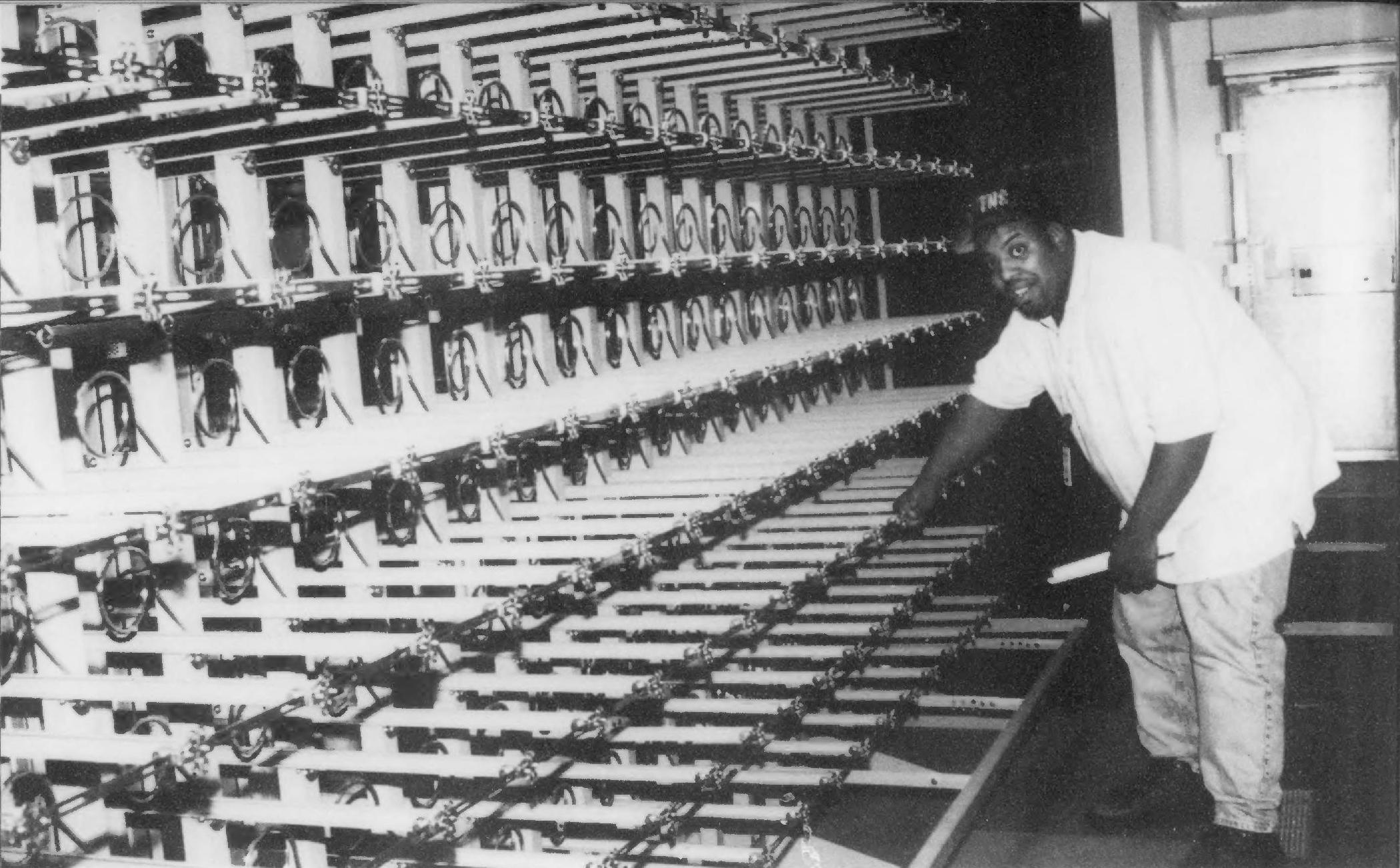
Technician Thadius Harrell installing a new main distribution frame at the Center in 1998

The Beltsville Information Management Center (BIMC), formerly named the Beltsville Messaging Center (BMC) and the Beltsville Communications Center (also known as the Beltsville Communications Annex), is a United States Department of State facility located in Beltsville, Maryland, next door to the U.S. Special Collection Service (SCS). It serves as the primary relay facility for the Diplomatic Telecommunications Service and services the communications needs of various U.S. government programs and agencies, including the SCS.

== History ==
Prior to 1985, the Department of State's telecommunications system resided at the department's headquarters in Washington, D.C. State Department leaders worried that this left the department's communications infrastructure vulnerable to catastrophic disasters and emergencies, and thus in 1984 Congress authorized the construction of a backup communications facility, the Beltsville Communications Center, in Beltsville, Maryland, 14 miles (23 km) north of the capital. The facility has since expanded to become a major communications network management center, serving as the primary hub of the Diplomatic Telecommunications Service. The facility covers 142,000 square feet (13,200 m^{2}) and, as of 1998, was staffed by 32 civil service and foreign service employees and 56 contract support personnel.

== Functions ==
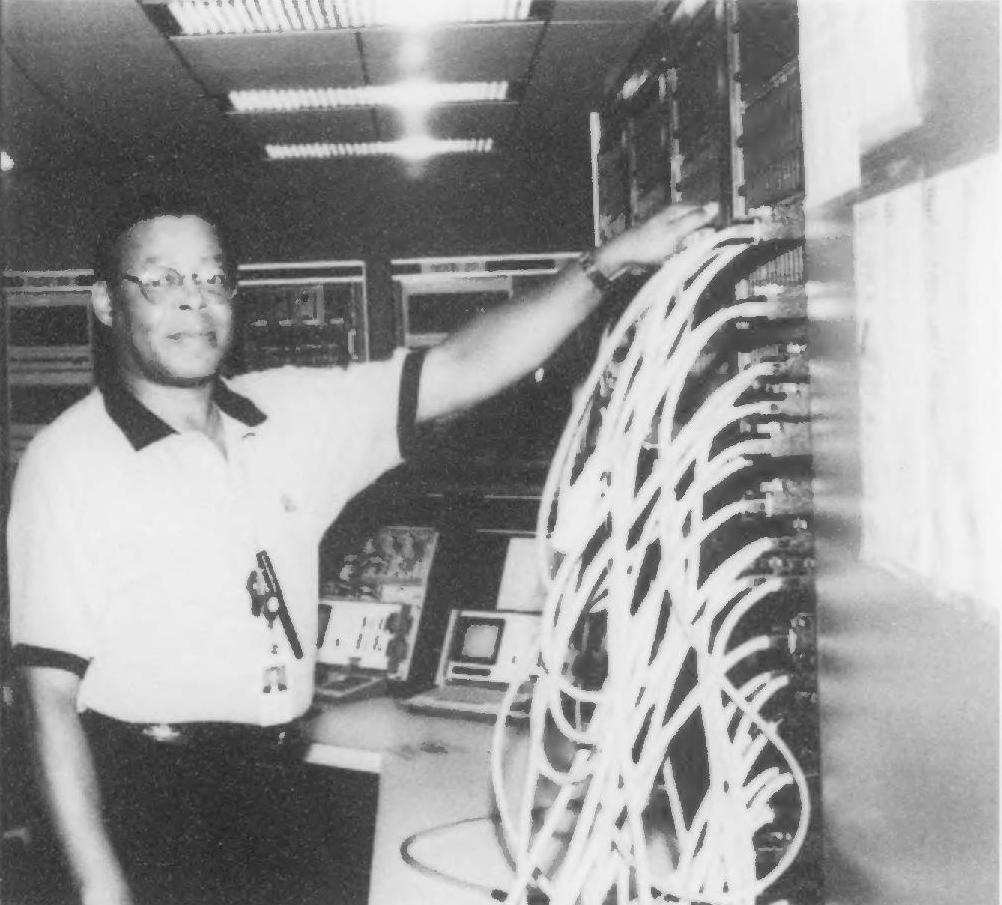
Equipment at the Center

According to the Department of State, the BIMC is charged with "eliminating the potential for disruption or loss of telecommunications between the Department and its mission abroad". The Beltsville center must continue to operate when the communications center at the department's headquarters cannot. The Alternate Communications Center, which is housed within the complex, allows messages to be relayed without being routed through the department's primary communications center. In 1998, the center was reported to relay more than 143,000 official records and 90,000 data messages to diplomatic posts and foreign affairs agencies each day. An onsite fuel storage facility can sustain the BIMC for 38 days, while a 150,000-US-gallon (570,000-litre) water tank can sustain the center for at least eight days—the site consumes between 8,000 and 10,000 US gallons (30,000 and 38,000 litres) of water each day to maintain a stable temperature and cool mainframe computers. The BIMC also houses the Foreign Affairs Data Processing Center, which moved into a 99,000 square feet (9,200 m^{2}) addition to the complex in 1991.

The United States Agency for International Development (USAID) has moved several programs into the BIMC. In 1995, the facility began serving as the central delivery point for USAID's information technology services. In 1997, USAID moved its Emergency Operations Center to the BIMC.

=== Special Collection Service ===
The BIMC is located next door to the headquarters of the U.S. Special Collection Service, a joint Central Intelligence Agency–National Security Agency eavesdropping program. According to Foreign Policy, satellite imagery from the 1990s shows fiber optic cable linking the SCS headquarters to the BIMC, which indicates that the BIMC services the communications needs of the SCS. According to The Week, when SCS personnel are deployed abroad, they often work ostensibly as members of the Diplomatic Telecommunications Service.
