= Abraham Hall =

Historic building in Maryland, US

- U.S. National Register of Historic Places
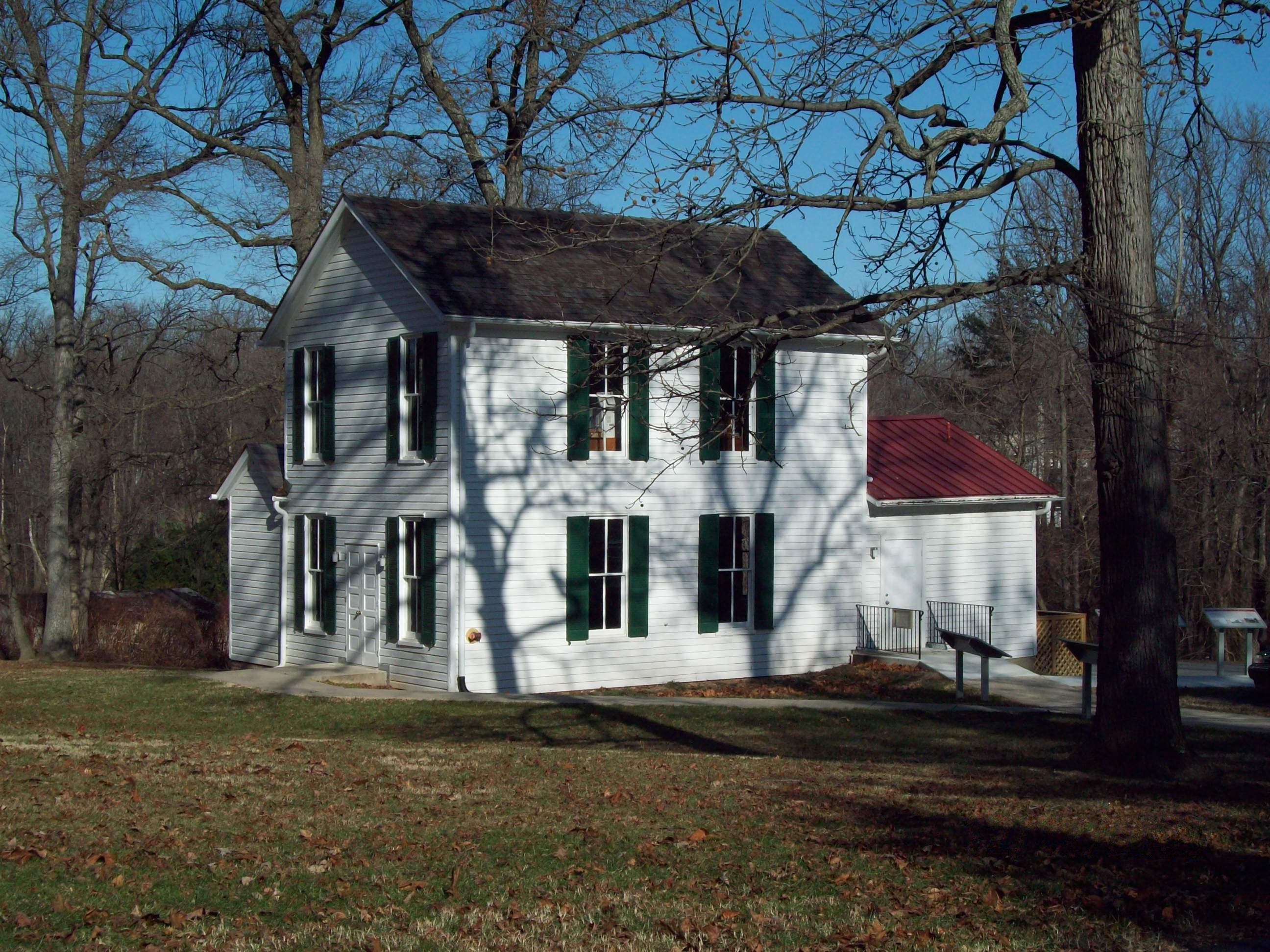
- Abraham Hall, December 2008

- Location within Maryland Location within the United States
- Location: 7612 Old Muirkirk Rd, Beltsville, Maryland
- Coordinates: 39°3′40″N 76°52′24″W
- Area: 3.9 acres (1.6 ha)
- Built: 1889; 137 years ago
- Architect: John W. Jackson
- MPS: African-American Historic Resources of Prince George's County, Maryland
- NRHP reference No.: 05000146
- Added to NRHP: March 14, 2005

Abraham Hall, constructed in 1889, is located on the northeast side of Old Muirkirk Road in the center of the historic African American community of Rossville, a section of Prince George's County, Maryland near Beltsville.

It was constructed by the Benevolent Sons and Daughters of Abraham, an African American society that was established for the social welfare of its members. Originally known as Rebecca Lodge #6 of the Benevolent Sons and Daughters of Abraham, the building was constructed by John W. Jackson in 1889 in the burgeoning community of Rossville. Abraham Hall, an excellent example of a multi-purpose building associated with African Americans, served as a meeting hall, a house of worship, a school, and a social hall for African Americans living in a segregated society. The lodge hall functioned as the community black school, until a Rosenwald School was built in 1922.

The structure is set back from the road on a 3.85-acre (1.56 ha) grassy lot with mature trees. It is a three-bay, two-story gable front frame lodge building with a brick foundation, wood lap siding with cornerboards, and a shake roof with a boxed cornice. A brick chimney rises from the northwest slope of the roof. Both the interior and exterior of the building were carefully restored between 1986 and 1991 using original materials or in-kind replacements.

It was listed on the National Register of Historic Places in 2005.
