= Fairmount Heights, Maryland =

Town in Prince George's County, Maryland, US

- Town
- Town of Fairmount Heights
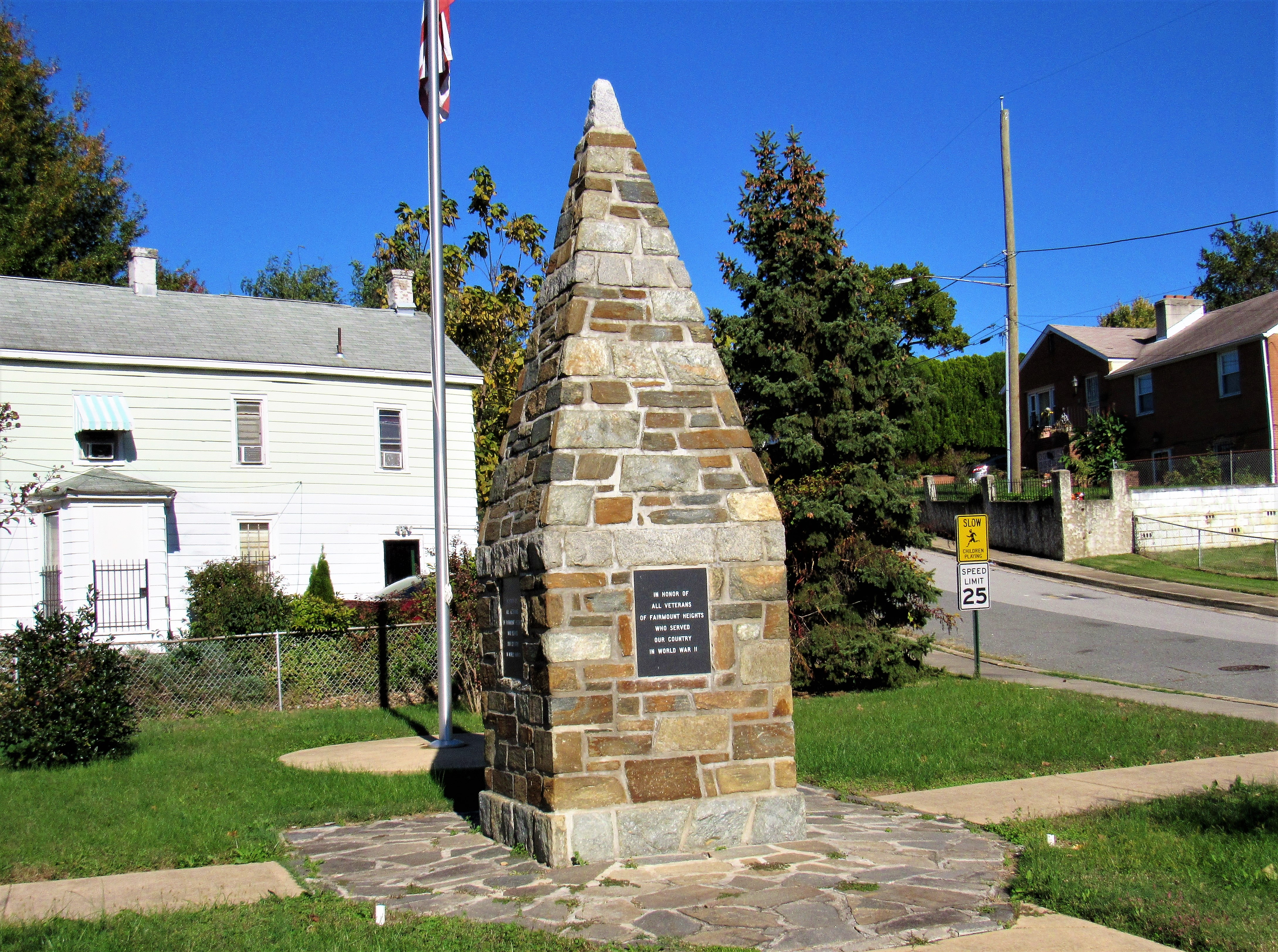
- World War II Monument

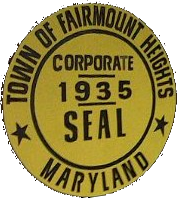
- Flag Seal

- Location of Fairmount Heights, Maryland
- Coordinates: 38°54′6″N 76°54′52″W
- Country: United States of America
- State: Maryland
- County: Prince George's
- Incorporated: 1935

Government
  - Type: Mayor-council government
  - Mayor: Lillie Thompson-Martin

Area
  - Total: 0.27 sq mi (0.69 km^{2})
  - Land: 0.27 sq mi (0.69 km^{2})
  - Water: 0 sq mi (0.00 km^{2})
- Elevation: 98 ft (30 m)

Population (2020)
  - Total: 1,528
  - Density: 5,770.7/sq mi (2,228.08/km^{2})
- Time zone: UTC-5 (Eastern (EST))
  - Summer (DST): UTC-4 (EDT)
- Zip Code: 20743
- Area code: 301
- FIPS code: 24-27400
- GNIS feature ID: 0597387
- Website: www.fairmountheightsmd.gov

Fairmount Heights is a town in Prince George's County, Maryland, United States. Per the 2020 census, the population was 1,528. The town was formally incorporated in 1935, making the town the second oldest African-American-majority municipality in Prince George's County. The town is composed of six subdivisions: Fairmount Heights (1900), Waterford (1907), Mount Weissner (1909), North Fairmount Heights (1910), West Fairmount Heights (1911) and Sylvan Vista (1923).

== History ==
Two Washington, D.C. land developers and lawyers, Allen Clark and Robinson White, platted the first subdivision of Fairmount Heights; separate developers platted the remaining five. Land speculators had purchased the farms that were previously in the area and consolidated the land for development. Clark and White sold the lots to African-Americans. Service on the Washington, Baltimore and Annapolis Electric Railway to the Gregory Station of nearby Seat Pleasant was established in 1908. Fairmount Heights incorporated in 1935 with all six subdivisions. The Fairmount Heights Historic District was added to the National Register of Historic Places in 2011.

== Mayors ==
- Robert S. Nichols (1935–1937)
- Ulysses Mackall (1941–1943)
- James A. Campbell (1943–1955)
- Doswell E. Brooks (1955–1967)
- Lawrence L. Brooks Sr. (1967–1973)
- Charles C. Davis (1973–1977)
- Robert R. Gray (1977–1991)
- Ruth S. Brown (1991–1993)
- Jerome T. Countee (1993–1997)
- Kathleen T. Scott (1997–1998)
- R. Dean Cooks * (1998–1999)
- Johnnie R. Saxton (1999–2003)
- Lillie Thompson-Martin (2003–2007)
- Madeline E. Richardson (2007–2009)
- Nathaniel R. Mines Jr. (2009–2011)
- Lillie Thompson-Martin (2011–2015)
- Patricia M. Waiters (2015–2017)
- Lillie Thompson-Martin (2017–Present)

(*)- Served as acting mayor

== Government ==
The Town Council of Fairmount Heights consists of six elected councilmembers and an elected mayor who sits as chair of the council. The mayor and councilmembers are elected to serve for two years. The following are current officers of the town:

- Lillie Thompson-Martin Mayor, 2017
- Marshon S. Moreno, 2017
- Sherri Downing, 2017
- Jacqueline Wood-Dodson, 2016
- Elysha Saunders, 2016
- Dean Cook, 2016
- Patricia Ukkundo'Oohwaka, 2017

Prince George's County Police Department District 3 Station in Landover CDP serves the community.

== Notable people ==
- Prominent architect William Sidney Pittman built his home on Eastern Avenue; his wife, Portia, was the daughter of Booker T. Washington, founder of the Tuskegee Institute.

== Historic sites ==
The following is a list of historic sites in Fairmount Heights identified by the Maryland-National Capital Park and Planning Commission. On November 18, 2011, the Town of Fairmount Heights was added to the National Register of Historic Places as the Fairmont Heights Historic District.

	Site name	Image	Location	M-NCPPC Inventory Number	Comment
1	Samuel Hargrove House		5907 K Street	72-009-17	
2	W. Sidney Pittman House		505 Eastern Avenue	72-009-18	
3	Alice Dorsey House		910 59th Avenue	72-009-23	
4	Fairmount Heights (Grace) Methodist Episcopal Church		716 59th Avenue	72-009-25	
5	Trammell-Taylor House		717 59th Avenue	72-009-26	
6	Towles-Brooks House		708 59th Avenue	72-009-27	
7	Louis Brown House		701 58th Avenue	72-009-28	
8	World War II Monument		Corner of 59th Avenue and 59th Place	72-009-29	
9	Isaac Brown House		715 59th Place	72-009-30	
10	William B. Coles House		730 60th Avenue	72-009-31	
11	John S. Johnson House		612 60th Place	72-009-32	
12	Henry Pinckney House		608 60th Place	72-009-33	
13	Cornelius Fonville House		602 60th Place	72-009-35	
14	Doswell Brooks House		6107 Foote Street	72-009-36	
15	Charity Hall		715 61st Avenue	72-009-38	
16	Robert S. Nichols House		802 58th Avenue	72-009-39	
17	Bungalow Row House #1		610 62nd Avenue	72-009-41	
18	Prince Albert Washington House		949 Eastern Avenue	72-009-43	
19	Bungalow Row House #2		700 62nd Avenue	72-009-45	
20	Bungalow Row House #3		709 62nd Avenue	72-009-46	
21	Bungalow Row House #4		711 62nd Avenue	72-009-47	
22	Tyrone and Caroline Bush House		5603 Addison Road	72-009-48	

== Bordering areas ==
- Washington, D.C. (southwest)
- Seat Pleasant (southeast)
- Landover (northeast)
- Cheverly (north)

== Geography ==
Fairmount Heights is located at 38°54′6″N 76°54′52″W (38.901761, −76.914504).

According to the United States Census Bureau, the town has a total area of 0.27 square miles (0.70 km^{2}), all land.

== Demographics ==
Historical population
Census	Pop.	Note	%±
1930	1,218		—
1940	1,391		14.2%
1950	2,097		50.8%
1960	2,308		10.1%
1970	1,972		−14.6%
1980	1,616		−18.1%
1990	1,238		−23.4%
2000	1,508		21.8%
2010	1,494		−0.9%
2020	1,528		2.3%
U.S. Decennial Census; 2010 2020

=== Racial and ethnic composition ===
Fairmount Heights town, Maryland – Racial and ethnic composition Note: the US Census treats Hispanic/Latino as an ethnic category. This table excludes Latinos from the racial categories and assigns them to a separate category. Hispanics/Latinos may be of any race.
Race / Ethnicity (NH = Non-Hispanic)	Pop 2000	Pop 2010	Pop 2020	% 2000	% 2010	% 2020
White alone (NH)	13	15	17	0.86%	1.00%	1.11%
Black or African American alone (NH)	1,440	1,313	1,091	95.49%	87.88%	71.40%
Native American or Alaska Native alone (NH)	3	6	0	0.20%	0.40%	0.00%
Asian alone (NH)	1	12	29	0.07%	0.80%	1.90%
Native Hawaiian or Pacific Islander alone (NH)	0	0	0	0.00%	0.00%	0.00%
Other race alone (NH)	2	0	2	0.13%	0.00%	0.13%
Mixed race or Multiracial (NH)	32	27	44	2.12%	1.81%	2.88%
Hispanic or Latino (any race)	17	121	345	1.13%	8.10%	22.58%
Total	1,508	1,494	1,528	100.00%	100.00%	100.00%

=== 2020 census ===
As of the 2020 census, Fairmount Heights had a population of 1,528. The median age was 37.9 years. 24.7% of residents were under the age of 18 and 15.2% were 65 years of age or older. For every 100 females there were 91.5 males, and for every 100 females age 18 and over there were 90.7 males.

100.0% of residents lived in urban areas, while 0.0% lived in rural areas.

There were 526 households, of which 38.8% had children under the age of 18 living in them. Of all households, 32.9% were married-couple households, 22.6% were households with a male householder and no spouse or partner present, and 37.6% were households with a female householder and no spouse or partner present. About 25.4% of all households were made up of individuals, and 11.6% had someone living alone who was 65 years of age or older.

There were 577 housing units, of which 8.8% were vacant. The homeowner vacancy rate was 5.4% and the rental vacancy rate was 2.6%.

=== 2010 census ===
As of the census of 2010, there were 1,494 people, 517 households, and 370 families residing in the town. The population density was 5,533.3 inhabitants per square mile (2,136.4/km^{2}). There were 589 housing units at an average density of 2,181.5 per square mile (842.3/km^{2}). The racial makeup of the town was 2.9% White, 88.6% African American, 0.4% Native American, 0.8% Asian, 5.3% from other races, and 1.9% from two or more races. Hispanic or Latino of any race were 8.1% of the population.

There were 517 households, of which 36.9% had children under the age of 18 living with them, 30.0% were married couples living together, 33.5% had a female householder with no husband present, 8.1% had a male householder with no wife present, and 28.4% were non-families. 24.2% of all households were made up of individuals, and 7.3% had someone living alone who was 65 years of age or older. The average household size was 2.88 and the average family size was 3.34.

The median age in the town was 37.3 years. 24.8% of residents were under the age of 18; 10.3% were between the ages of 18 and 24; 25.7% were from 25 to 44; 27.3% were from 45 to 64; and 12% were 65 years of age or older. The gender makeup of the town was 49.2% male and 50.8% female.

=== 2000 census ===
As of the census of 2000, there were 1,508 people, 498 households, and 361 families residing in the town. The population density was 5,622.7 inhabitants per square mile (2,170.9/km^{2}). There were 561 housing units at an average density of 2,091.7 per square mile (807.6/km^{2}). The racial makeup of the town was 1.13% White, 95.82% African American, 0.27% Native American, 0.07% Asian, 0.60% from other races, and 2.12% from two or more races. Hispanic or Latino of any race were 1.13% of the population.

There were 498 households, out of which 29.7% had children under the age of 18 living with them, 36.9% were married couples living together, 26.7% had a female householder with no husband present, and 27.5% were non-families. 21.9% of all households were made up of individuals, and 8.4% had someone living alone who was 65 years of age or older. The average household size was 3.03 and the average family size was 3.52.

In the town, the population was spread out, with 29.0% under the age of 18, 7.6% from 18 to 24, 28.0% from 25 to 44, 24.0% from 45 to 64, and 11.4% who were 65 years of age or older. The median age was 36 years. For every 100 females, there were 89.9 males. For every 100 females age 18 and over, there were 90.2 males.

The median income for a household in the town was $48,250, and the median income for a family was $53,304. Males had a median income of $34,107 versus $34,327 for females. The per capita income for the town was $17,966. About 6.9% of families and 9.3% of the population were below the poverty line, including 11.3% of those under age 18 and 4.0% of those age 65 or over.

== Education ==
Fairmount Heights is a part of the Prince George's County Public Schools system.

Zoned elementary schools for town are Robert Gray and Seat Pleasant. All residents are zoned to G. James Gholson Middle School and Fairmont Heights High School.

Originally Charity Hall housed the school in Fairmount Heights. The previous Fairmount Heights Elementary School building, in the hip-frame style and two stories tall, is used as a church. Designed by W. Sidney Pittman, who headed the committee for the building's construction, the building opened in June 1912. Residents asked the county government for one in the beginning of 1911, and in April of that year the county board asked for the establishment of the school. The Mount Zion Apostolic Faith Church purchased the building in 1934; at that time a brick school building on Addison Road, with eight classrooms, became the new school building.

== Transportation ==
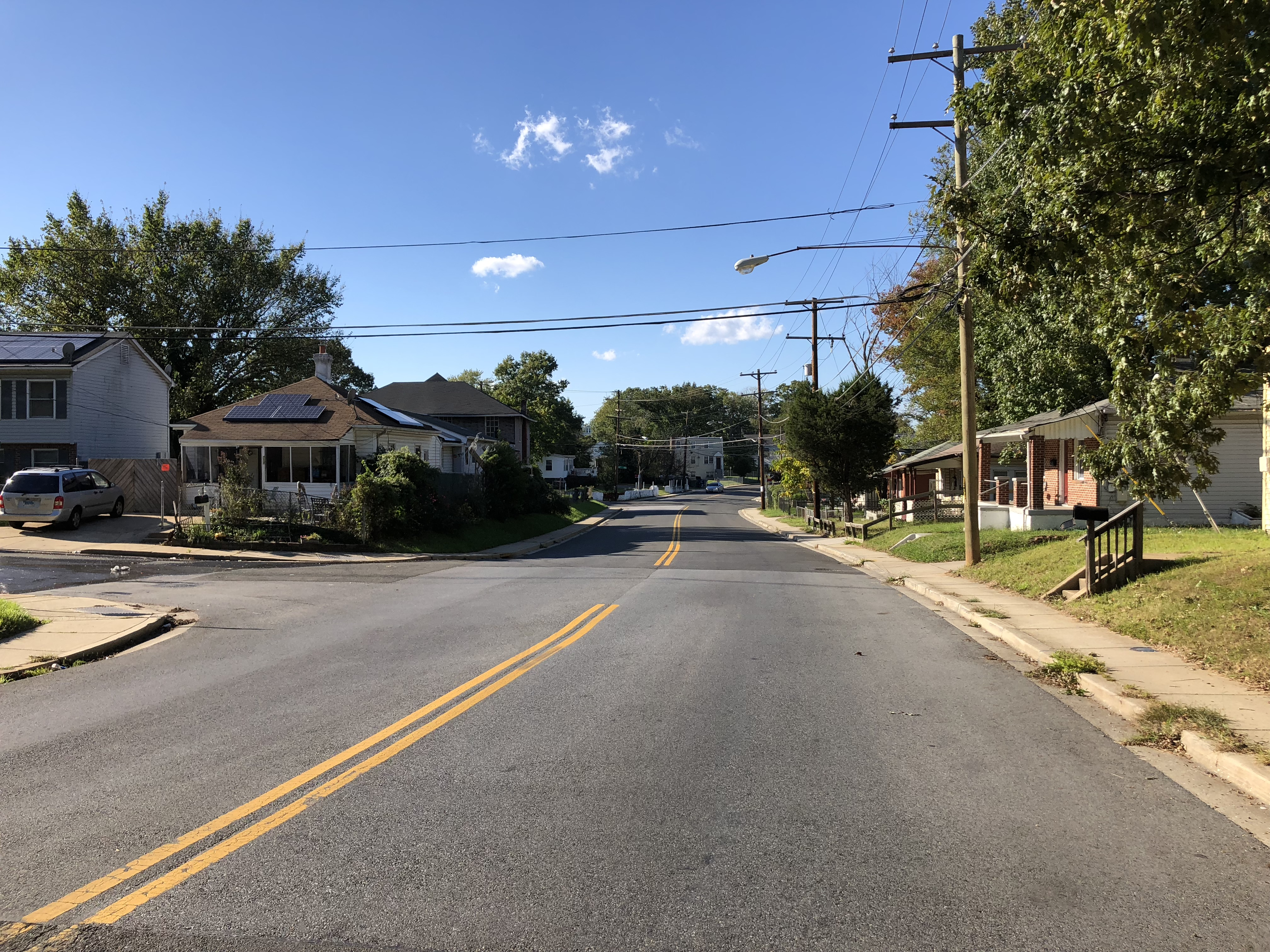
View northwest along Addison Road, the largest road completely within the borders of Fairmount Heights

The main road through Fairmount Heights is Addison Road. Other significant roads include Eastern Avenue, which forms the southwest border of town (adjacent to Washington, D.C.), and Sheriff Road, which forms the northwest and north border of the town. No state highways enter Fairmount Heights. The closest state highway is Maryland Route 704 in adjacent Seat Pleasant.
