= Northeast Branch Anacostia River =

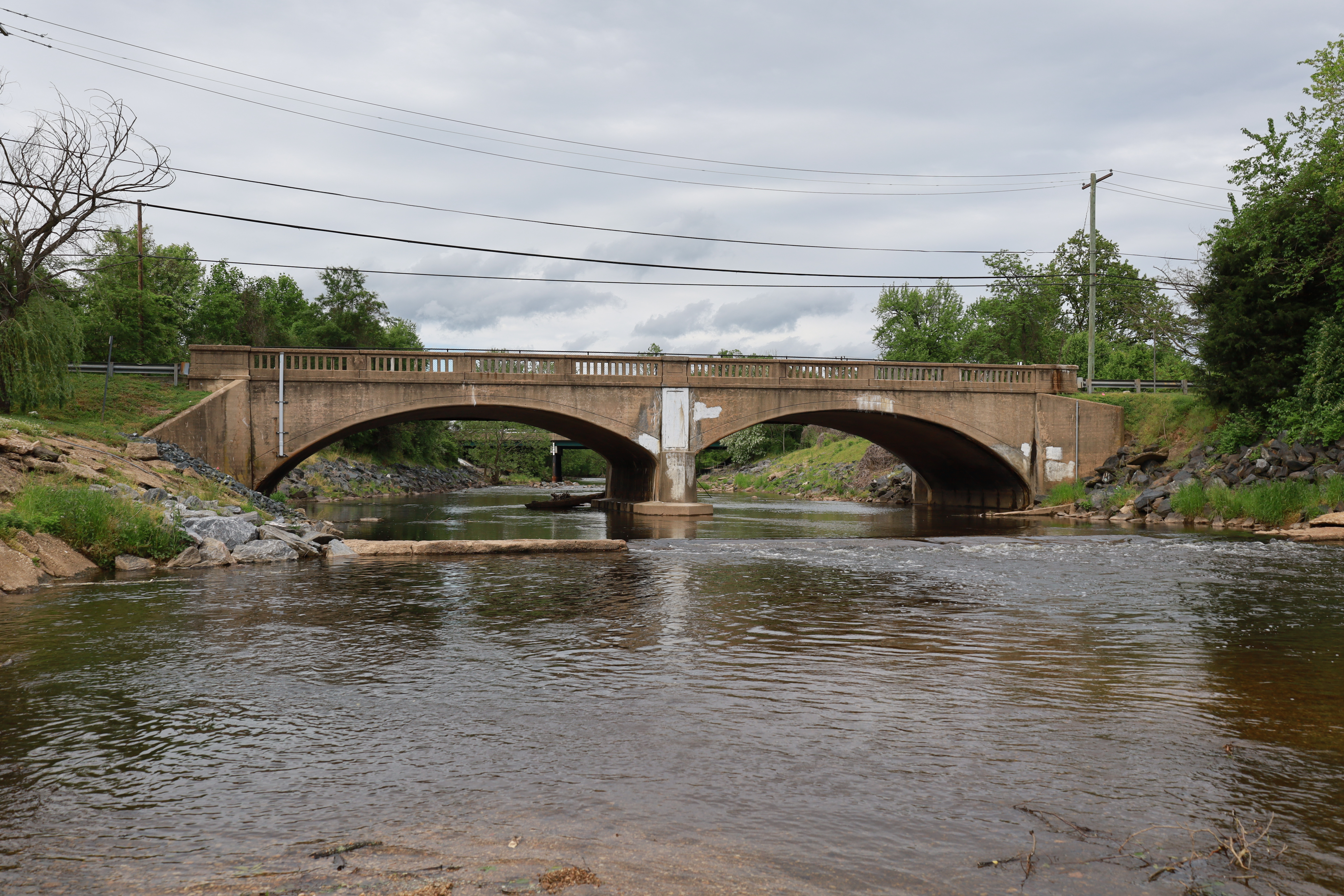

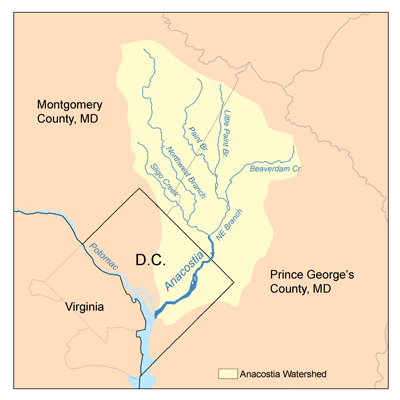
- Map of the Anacostia River watershed showing the Northeast Branch

Location
- Country: United States
- State: Maryland
- Cities: Beltsville, Greenbelt, College Park, Hyattsville

Physical characteristics
- Source: Paint Branch
  - location: Maryland
  - coordinates: 38.9786111°N 76.9169444°W
- Source confluence: College Park
- Mouth: Anacostia River
  - location: Bladensburg
  - coordinates: 38.9426111°N 76.9435856°W
- Length: 3 mi (4.8 km)
- Basin size: 75.6 sq mi (196 km^{2})

Basin features
- Tributaries
  - left: Brier Ditch

Northeast Branch Anacostia River is a 3.2-mile-long (5.1 km) free-flowing stream in Prince George's County, Maryland. It is a tributary of the Anacostia River, which flows to the Potomac River and the Chesapeake Bay.

== Course ==
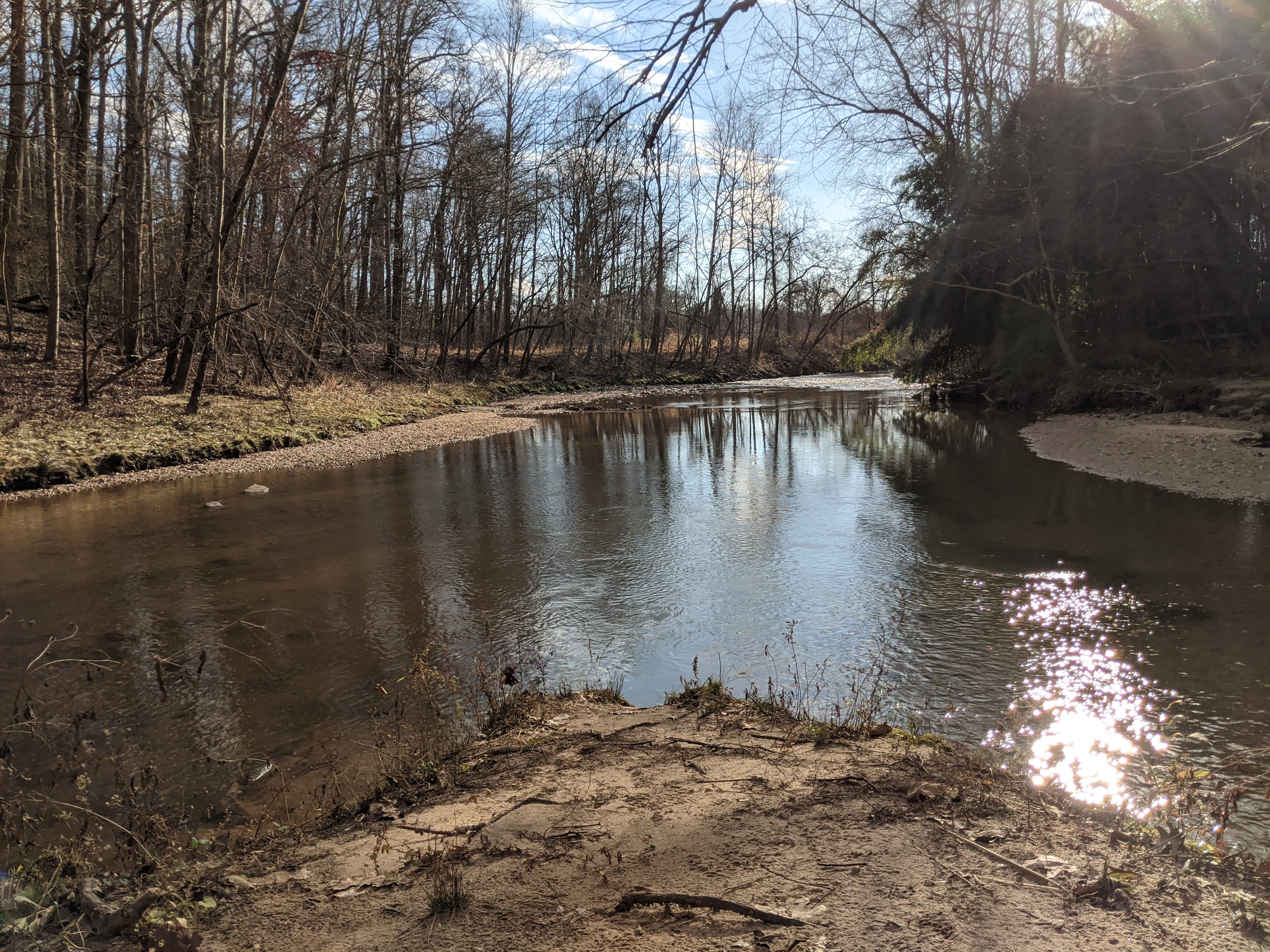
The Indian Creek and Paint Branch meet to form the Northeast Branch in College Park, Maryland.

The headwaters of the Northeast Branch are at the confluence of Indian Creek and Paint Branch, located on the eastern edge of the community of College Park. The stream flows southward for about 3 miles (5 km) to its confluence with the Northwest Branch near Bladensburg to form the mainstem of the Anacostia.

== Watershed ==
The Northeast Branch watershed in Prince George's County includes portions of the communities of Beltsville, Greenbelt, College Park, New Carrollton, Riverdale Park, Hyattsville, Berwyn Heights and Edmonston. Portions of the Paint Branch and Little Paint Branch tributaries also drain the Cloverly, Colesville, Fairland, White Oak and Hillandale communities in Montgomery County. Major institutions in the watershed include the Beltsville Agricultural Research Center, University of Maryland, College Park and Greenbelt Park. The total watershed area, including tributaries, is 75.6 square miles (196 km^{2}), with a resident population of about 246,530.

== Geology ==
Northeast Branch is located in the Atlantic coastal plain geologic region.

== Tributaries ==
The total stream channel length of Northeast Branch and all tributaries is 12.1 miles (19.5 km).

- Brier Ditch
- Indian Creek
- Little Paint Branch
- Paint Branch
- Still Creek
- Upper Beaverdam Creek

== See also ==
- List of Maryland rivers
- Anacostia Tributary Trails
