= St. John the Baptist Catholic Church (Silver Spring, Maryland) =

Church building in Silver Spring, Maryland, US

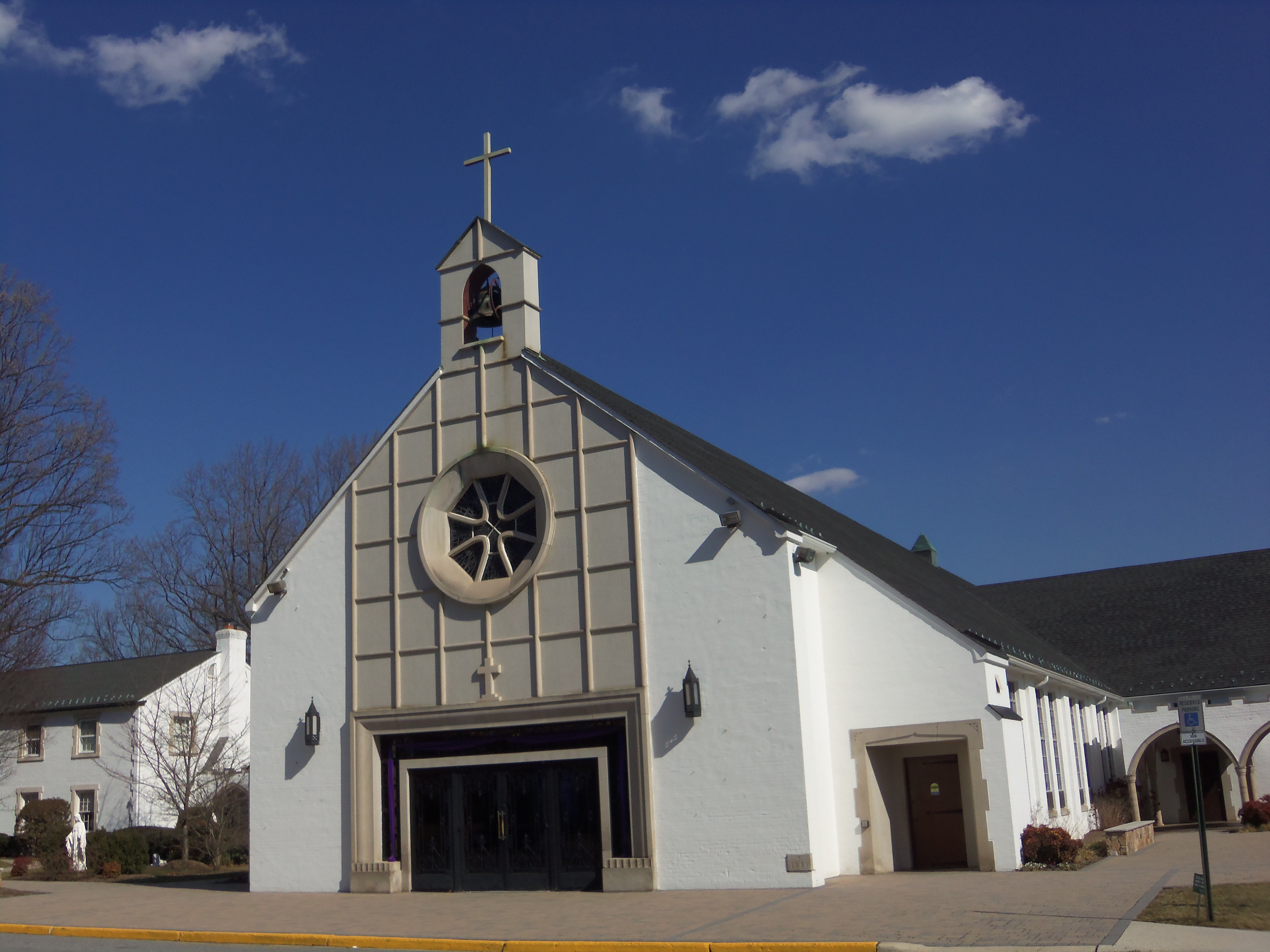

Religion
- Affiliation: Roman Catholic Church
- Province: Archdiocese of Washington

Location
- Location: 12319 New Hampshire Ave. Silver Spring, Maryland; United States
- Interactive map of St. John the Baptist Catholic Church
- Coordinates: 39.058424°N 76.995505°W

Architecture
- Style: Modified Gothic
- Materials: Brick, Stone

Website
- www.sjbssparish.com

Saint John the Baptist Catholic Church is a parish of the Roman Catholic Church in Silver Spring, Maryland, United States. It was established by the Archdiocese of Washington in 1960 and is dedicated to John the Baptist. Later, there was a school added on to the North part of the land in 1962, serving as a K-8 Catholic school.

== History ==
In 1956, the Archdiocese of Washington bought ten acres of land in the Springbrook-Colesville area of Silver Spring. In 1960, it designated the land for a new to be named St. John the Baptist Catholic Church. On June 2, 1960, Reverend E. Carl Lyon, Assistant Pastor at the Shrine of the Most Blessed Sacrament, Chevy Chase, D.C., met with Archbishop Patrick O'Boyle (later Cardinal), and the Archbishop appointed Fr. Lyon to be the pastor of the new parish.

Over the next weeks, Fr. Lyon worked tirelessly to get the new parish up and going. Fr. Lyon surveyed the property, purchased a home to be used as rectory and arranged for the basement of the rectory to be finished as a chapel, which would be used until a church could be built. St. John the Baptist Parish was officially founded on June 18, 1960 and, on the following morning, the first Mass was celebrated by Fr. Lyon in the rectory chapel, with 275 people in attendance.

On Sunday, May 7, 1961, despite threatening weather, an outdoor Mass was held on the grounds of St. John the Baptist and a ground-breaking ceremony was held. By Christmas that same year, the church building was complete. Mass was held in the Church, but the building was not dedicated until the following Spring.

On May 16, 1962, Archbishop O'Boyle laid the cornerstone, dedicated the church, and blessed the school. On this occasion, Mass was said. The Right Reverend Msgr. John K. Cartwright, Rector of St. Matthew's Cathedral, delivered the homily, in which he said, "Our Archbishop has just dedicated this church and community to St. John the Baptist. There is in this a beautiful portent. With the name of this great saint and prophet, we are brought to remember his message which is still pertinent to us: the call to holiness and purity of life and the reminder of the nearness of heaven to human lives. 'Repent for the Kingdom of Heaven is at hand.'" By this time, the church, rectory, and school were all erected and in use.

Additional buildings were added by the second pastor, Rev. Francis G. Kazista: the Lyon Center in 1988 and the Visitation Chapel and the Parish Center (Kazista Parish Center) in 2001. The parish grew in membership — 2162 families, over 6,000 persons.

In the mid-1990s, Mother Teresa (Saint Teresa of Calcutta) visited the parish as nineteen of her Missionaries of Charity took their vows there.

The parish participates in ecumenical activities along with other churches and synagogues in the Colesville, Maryland area.

== Personnel ==
Good Morning. We gather here this morning, as we do each week, to celebrate the great fact that God is in love with us.

— Msgr. E. Carl Lyon (d.1999)

The parish has had only three pastors. Father E. Carl Lyon (later Monsignor) founded the parish and guided it until his retirement in 1987. His successor was Father Francis Kazista, later Monsignor. Msgr. Kazista served as pastor at St. James Parish in Mount Rainier, Maryland from 1984–87. He was then appointed pastor of St. John the Baptist in 1987. Kazista had earlier served as a parochial vicar at St. John's for five years. As pastor of St. John's, Kazista served for nearly 25 years before retiring in 2011. He was succeeded by Father Y. David Brault in 2011.

Pastor: Fr. Y. David Brault
Associate Pastor: Fr. Cezary Kozubek
Weekend Associates:

- Fr. Glen Willis
- Fr. Austin Charles Ochu
- Fr. Eliot Nitz
- Fr. Nicolás Rodriguez

Permanent Deacons:

- Deacon James Gorman
- Deacon Ed McCormack

== Gallery ==
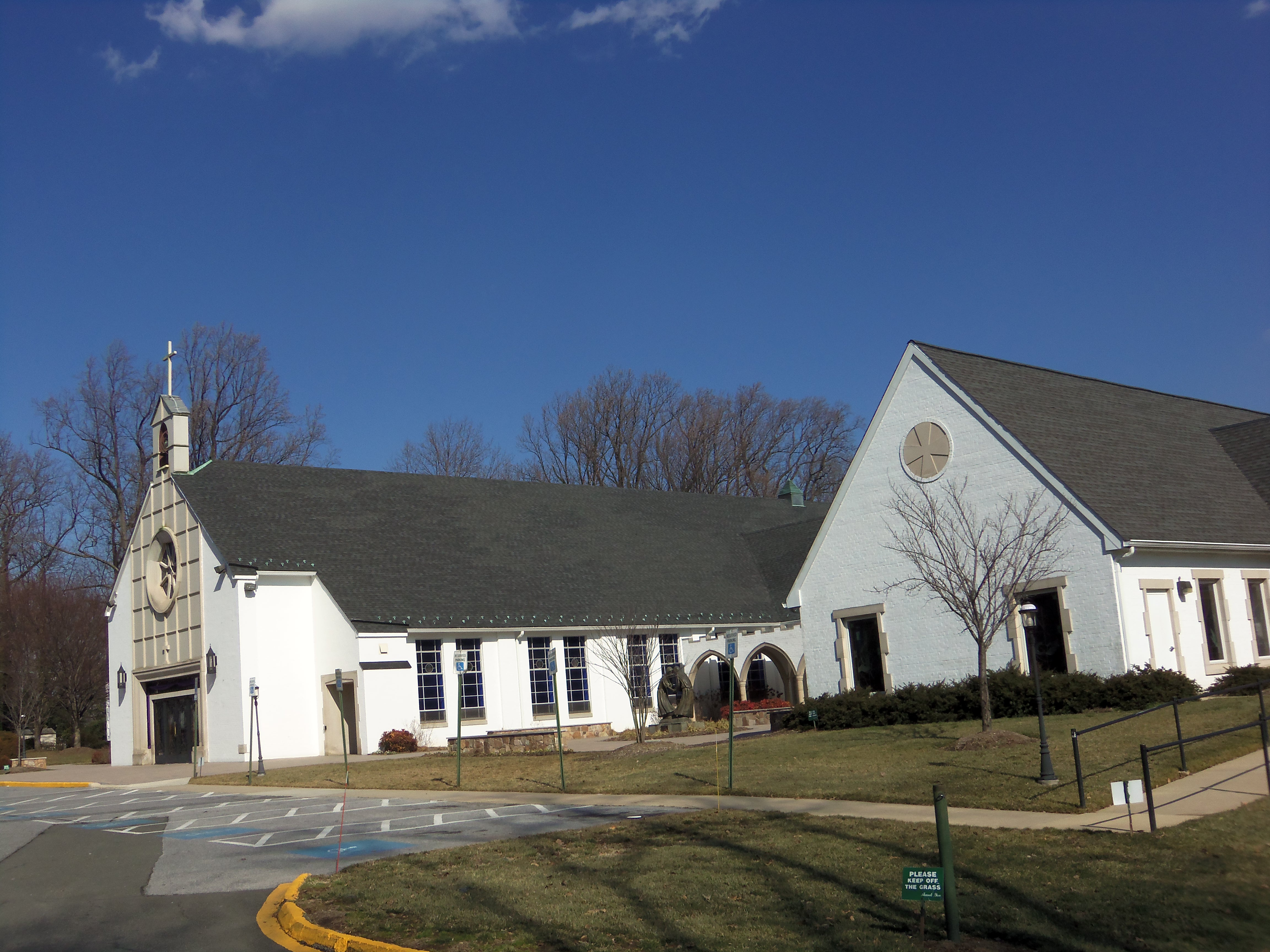
The Church and to the right, the building which contains the Chapel and Parish offices

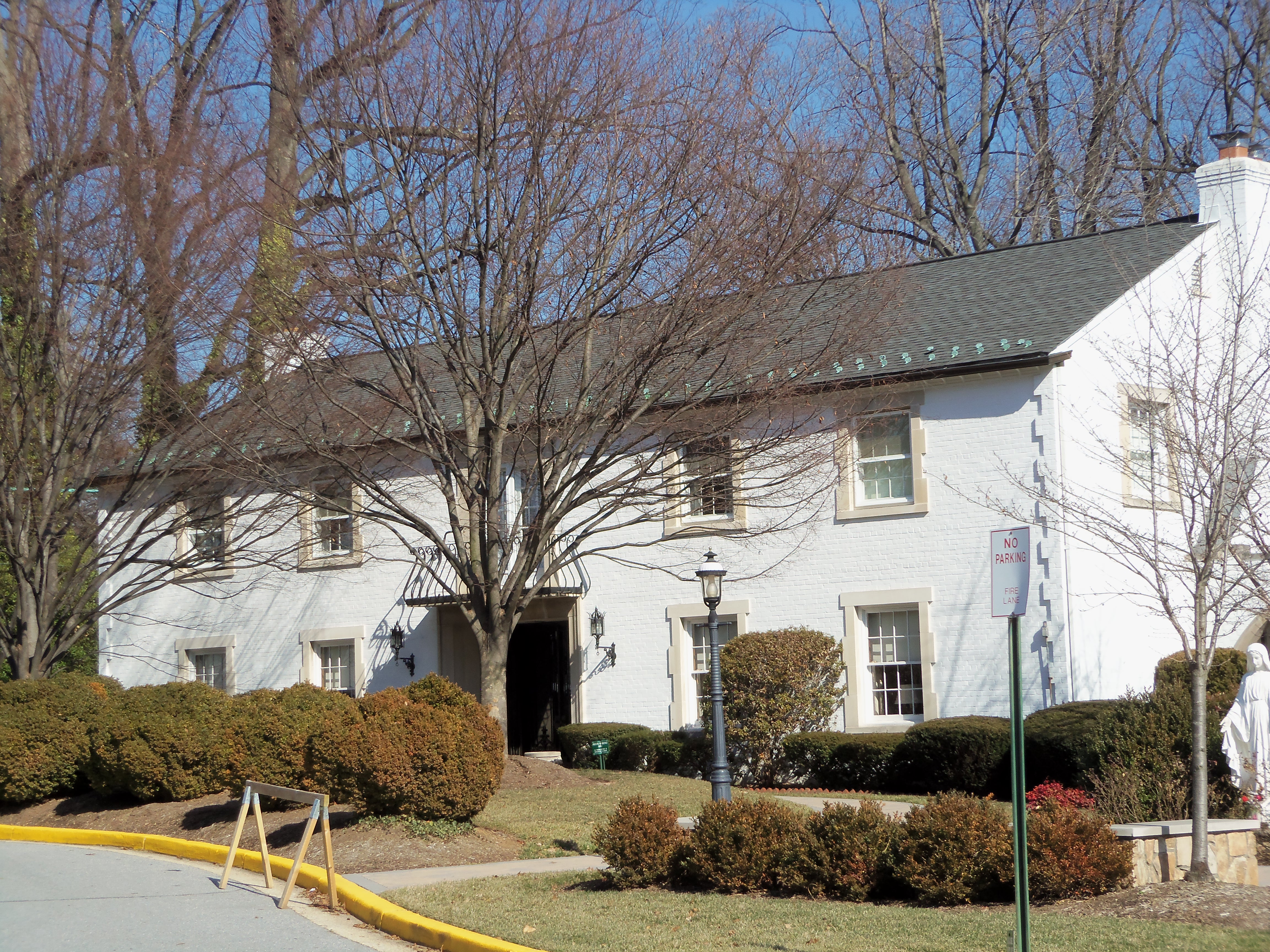
Parish rectory

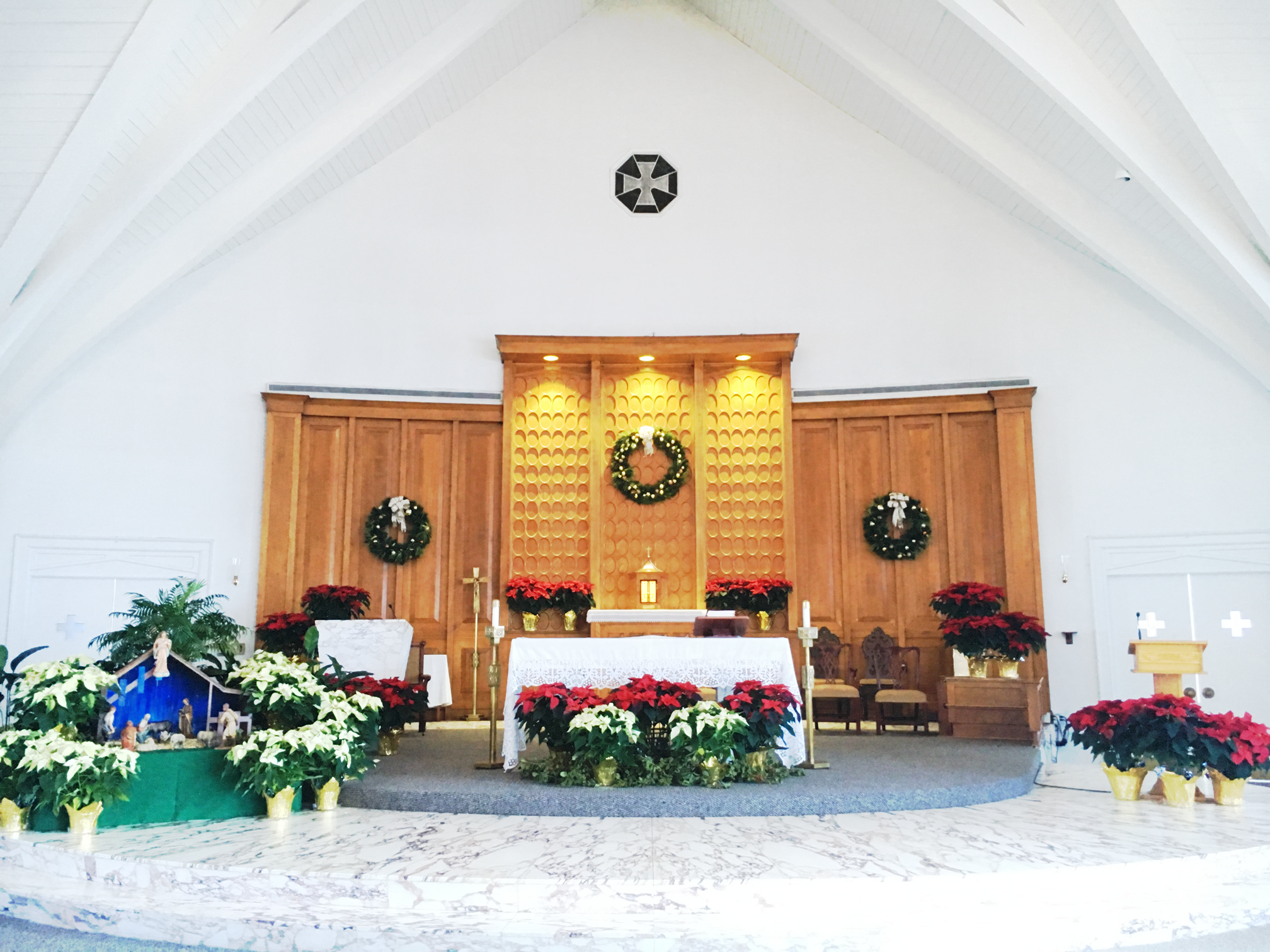
Parish altar

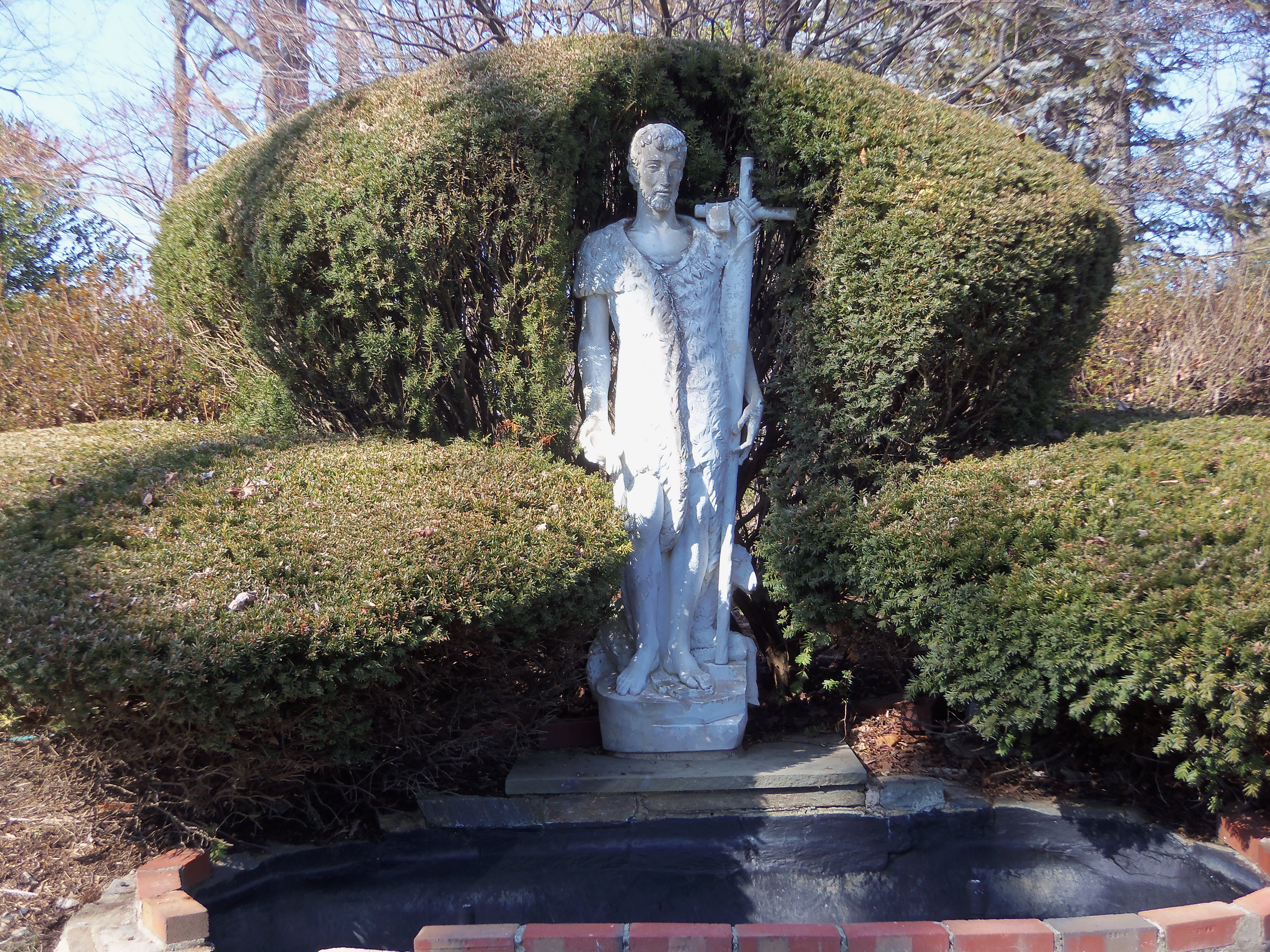
Statue of St. John the Baptist (made in Italy) in front of the outside fountain

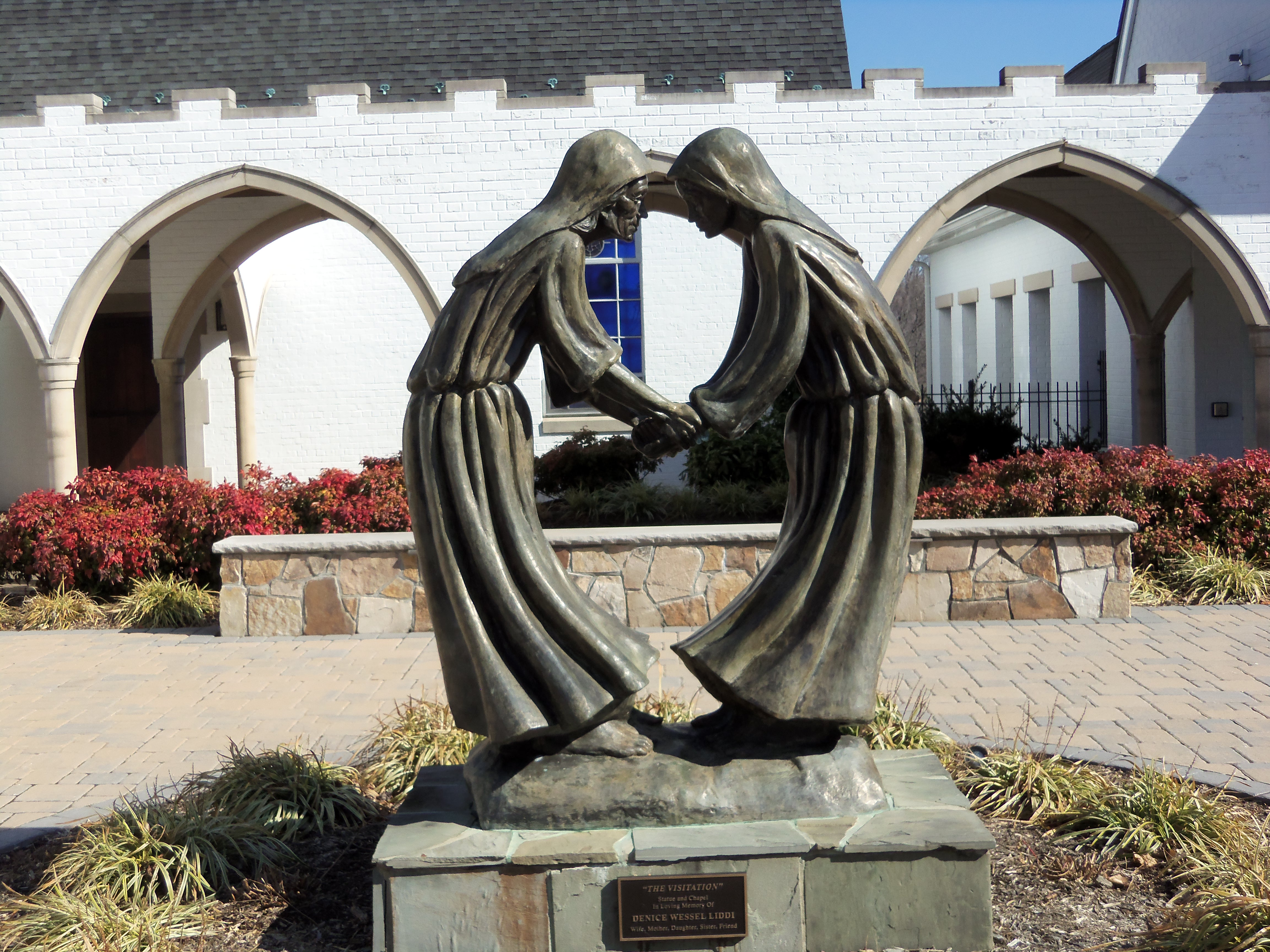
The Visitation of the Blessed Virgin

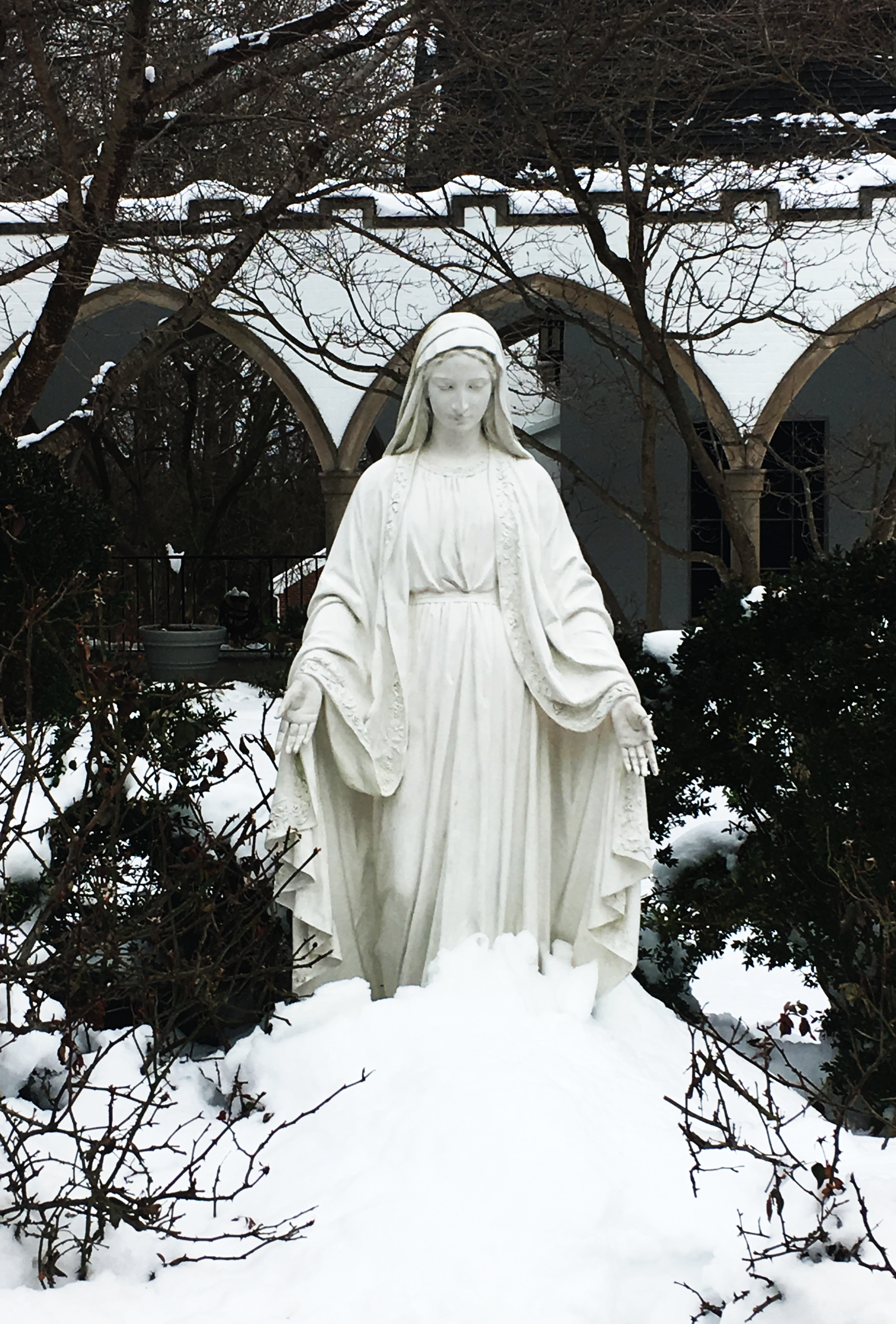
Statue of Our Lady of Graces (the Virgin Mary)

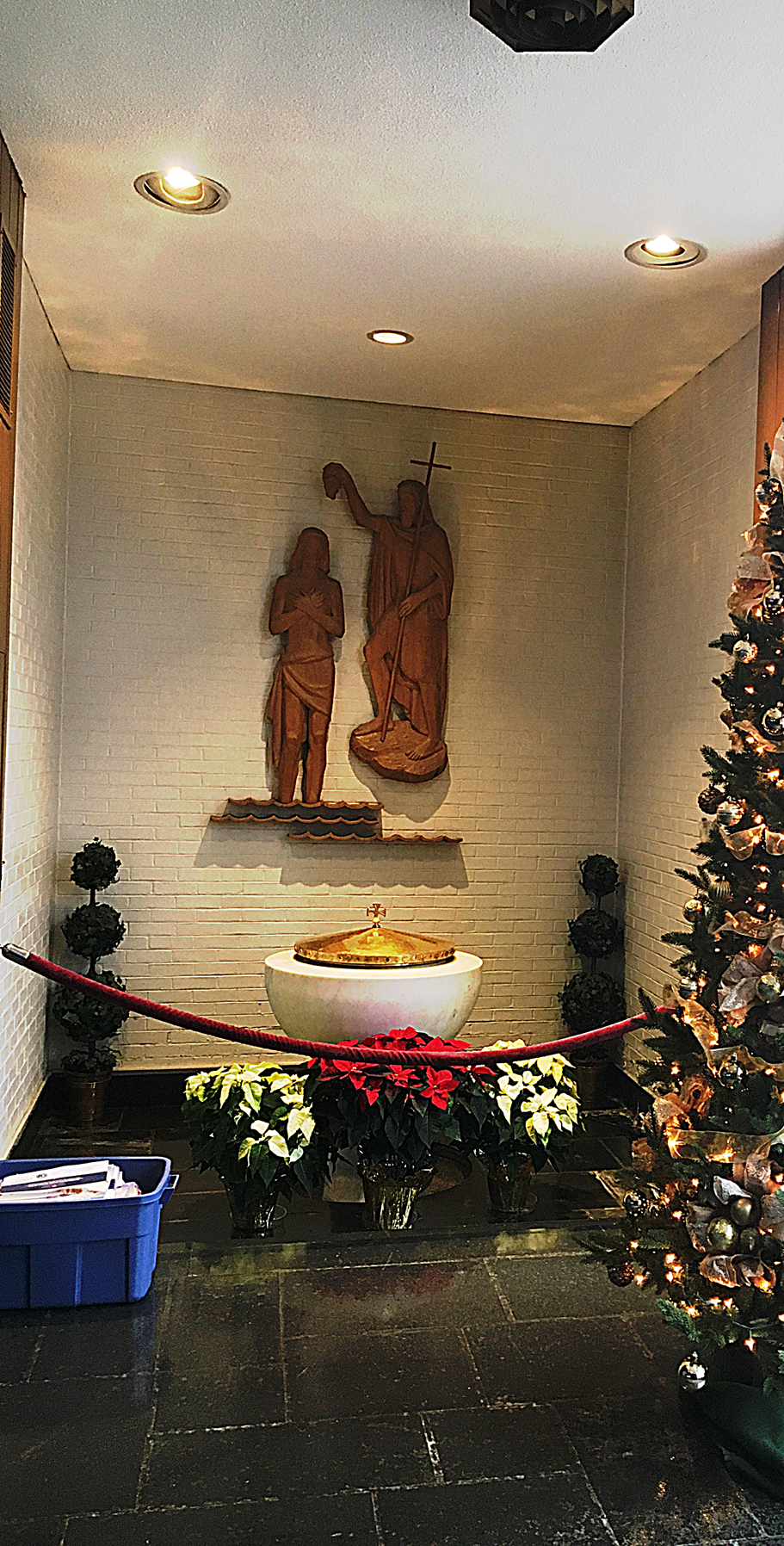
Baptismal font with the depiction of Jesus being baptized by John the Baptist in the background

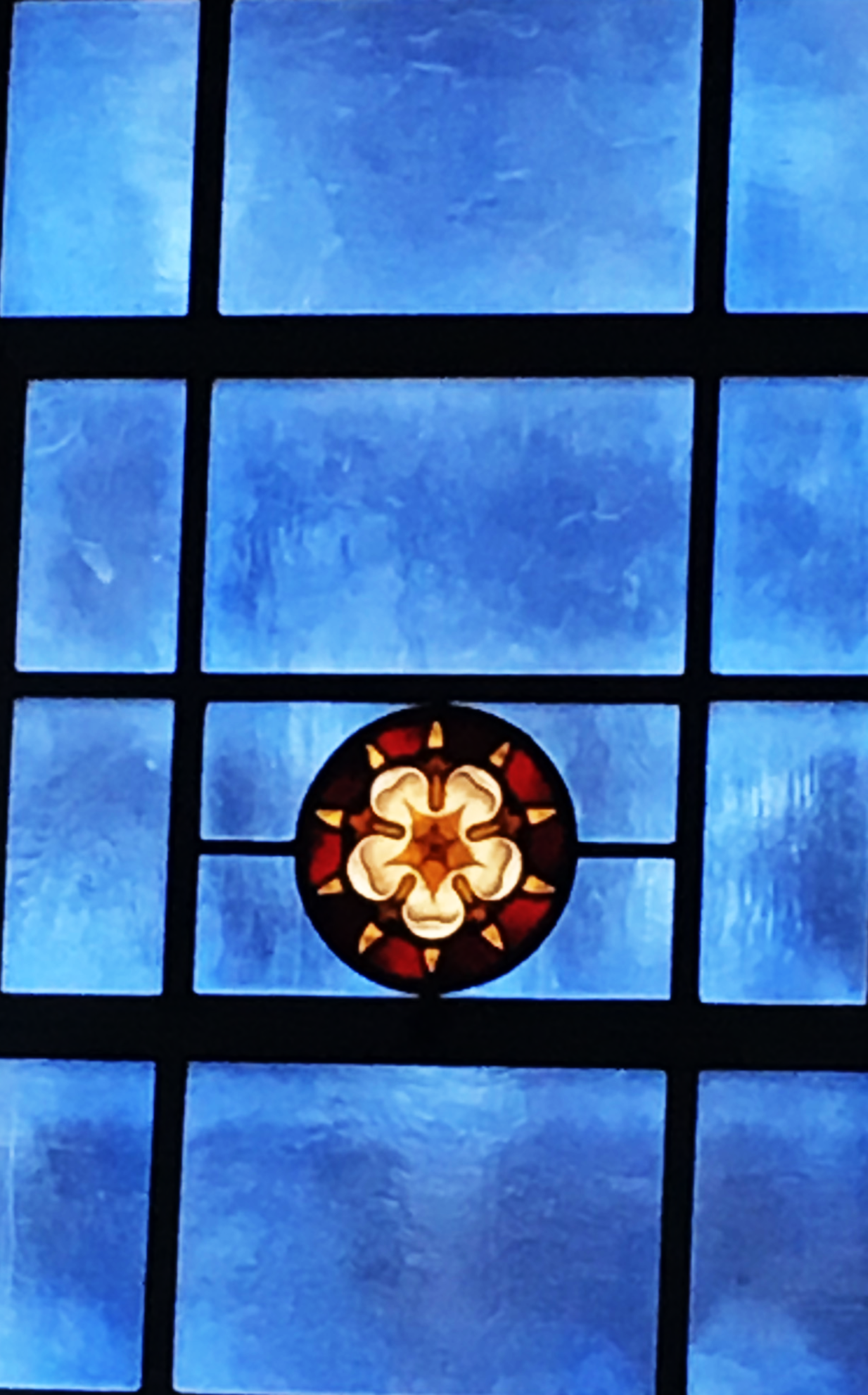
Of the 29 blue cathedral glass windows in the Church, each has its own liturgical stained glass symbol. This Rose represents the Virgin Mary.

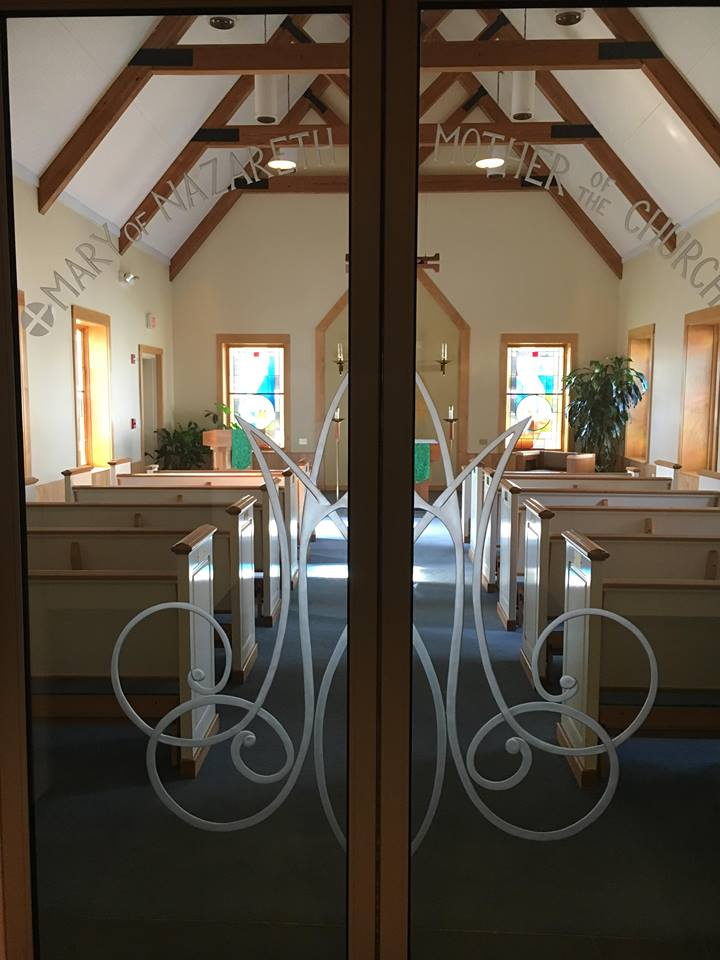
Chapel of Mary of Nazareth, Mother of the Church

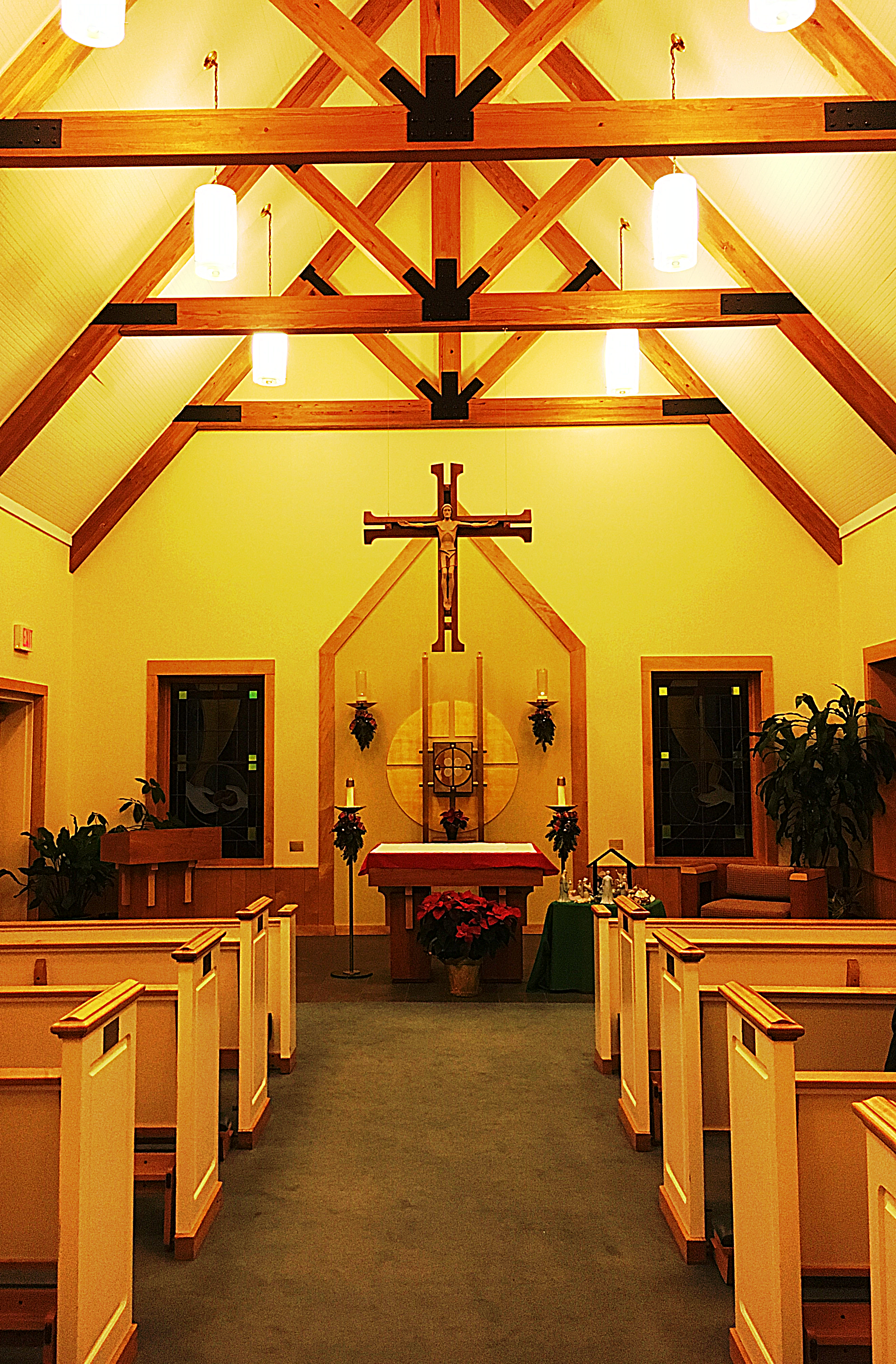
Inside of the Chapel of Mary of Nazareth, Mother of the Church
