= Smithville Colored School =

School in Colesville, Maryland (1927–1952)

Location
- 811 East Randolph Road, Colesville, Montgomery County, Maryland, U.S.
- Coordinates: 39.075433°N 76.995100°W

Information
- Other name: Smithville School
- Funding type: Rosenwald School
- Established: 1927
- Closed: 1952
- Website: www.iul1906.org/smithvilleschool

Smithville Colored School (1927–1952) was a two-room Rosenwald School for African American students in Colesville, Maryland, near Silver Spring. A historical marker erected in 2005 by Alpha Phi Alpha fraternity's Iota Upsilon Lambda chapter, in cooperation with the Montgomery County Historic Preservation Commission and the Maryland Historical Trust commemorates its history. It was also known as the Smithville School, and is now known as the Smithville School Museum and Education Center.

== History ==
The Smithville Colored School was established in 1927 one of the many schoolhouses built with the help of money from Julius Rosenwald. It was one of 15 school campuses for African American children in Montgomery County. Smithville was the name of a small, unincorporated black community near Colesville.

After the school closed in 1952, the building was used briefly used as a recreation center, and later as a storage facility and a bus depot. Students were transferred to a new school in Sandy Spring, Maryland. The deed to the school was transferred in 1999 from the Montgomery County Board of Education to the local chapter of Alpha Phi Alpha. From 1999 until 2005, members of the local Alpha Phi Alpha fraternity worked to renovate the building into a meeting place, computer center, and history museum.

== See also ==
- List of Rosenwald schools
