= Colesville, Maryland =

- Census-designated place
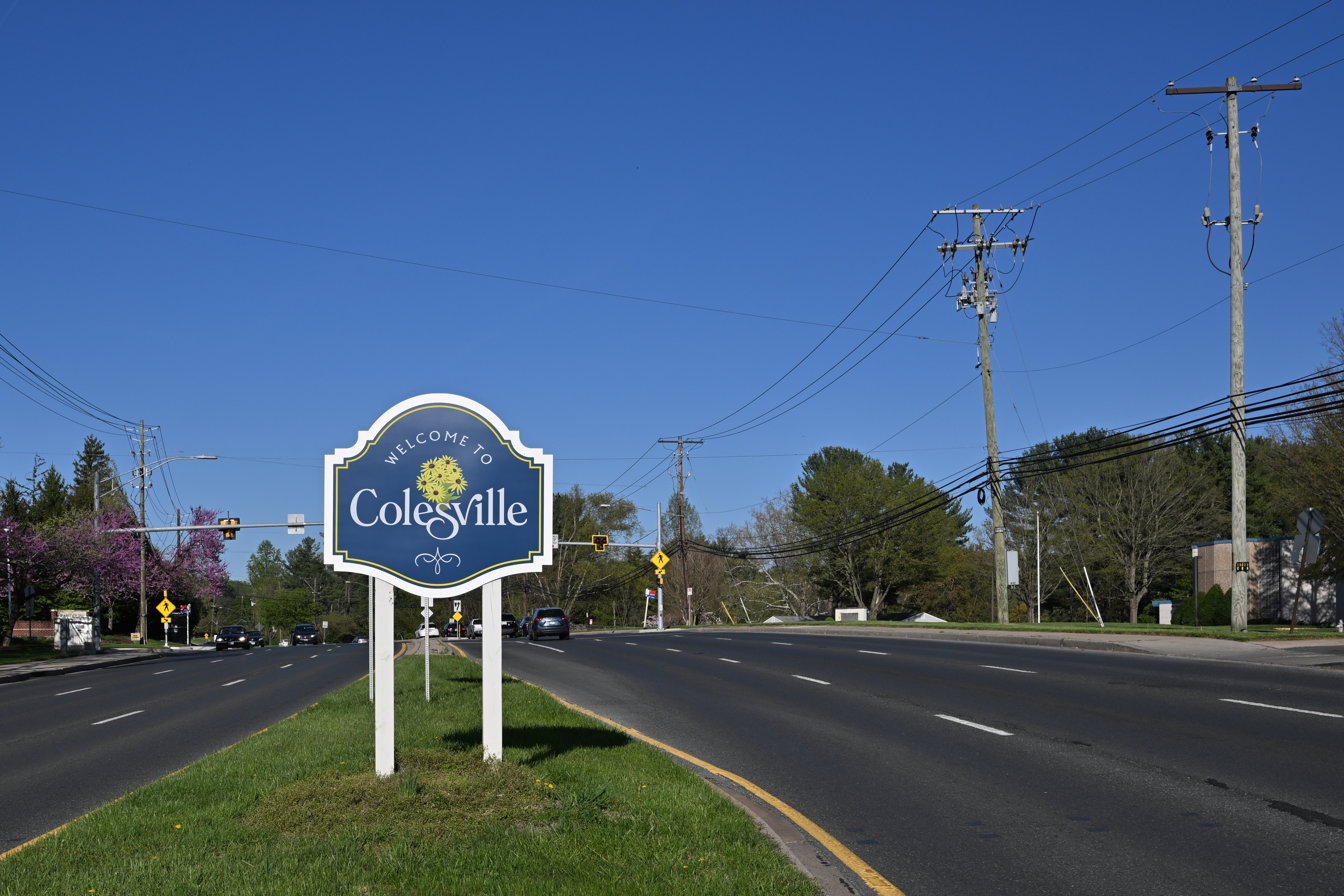

- Location of Colesville, Maryland
- Coordinates: 39°04′32″N 77°00′07″W
- Country: United States
- State: Maryland
- County: Montgomery

Area
  - Total: 5.13 sq mi (13.28 km^{2})
  - Land: 5.12 sq mi (13.25 km^{2})
  - Water: 0.012 sq mi (0.03 km^{2})
- Elevation: 433 ft (132 m)

Population (2020)
  - Total: 15,421
  - Density: 3,014.9/sq mi (1,164.05/km^{2})
- Time zone: UTC−5 (Eastern (EST))
  - Summer (DST): UTC−4 (EDT)
- ZIP codes: 20904, 20905, 20914
- Area codes: 301, 240
- FIPS code: 24-18475
- GNIS feature ID: 589998

Colesville is a census-designated place and an unincorporated area in Montgomery County, Maryland, United States. It had a population of 15,421 as of the 2020 census.

== Geography ==
As an unincorporated area, Colesville's boundaries are not officially defined. Many residents consider the town to be one of the many neighborhoods of Silver Spring. Colesville is recognized by USPS as an acceptable city name in two northeastern Montgomery County ZIP codes, with Silver Spring being the preferred city name. It is also recognized by the United States Census Bureau as a census-designated place, and by the United States Geological Survey as a populated place.

According to the United States Census Bureau, the place has a total area of 9.2 square miles (24 km^{2}), all land.

Colesville's generally accepted boundaries extend between the Northwest and Paint Branches of the Anacostia River. Its northern and southern boundaries are not as well-defined, but are usually assumed to run from Springbrook High School in the south to Cloverly in the north.

== History ==
The first land was purchased in Colesville from the Lords Baltimore in 1714, when Archibald Edmonston patented "Easy Purchase", a 900-acre (3.6 km^{2}) tract that extended from Meadowood south to near present-day Route 29. In 1715, "Easy Purchase" was bought by James Beall Sr., who that year also patented "Drumeldry", a 225-acre (0.91 km^{2}) tract from the Northwest Branch across Notley Road to Shannon Drive. In 1718, his nephew William Beall patented "Wolf's Den", a 317-acre (1.28 km^{2}) tract that straddled today's Bonifant Road and ran from Notley Road to Pebblestone Drive, and then southwest across the Northwest Branch.

However, none of these early landowners actually resided in Colesville. Robert Lazenby, thought to be the son of Henry Lazenby, High Sheriff of Anne Arundel County, purchased 217 acres (0.88 km^{2}) of the southern part of "Wolf's Den" from William Beall in 1723, and became the first resident farmer in Colesville.

In 1747, James Odell, grandson of James Beall Sr., was deeded 300 acres (1.2 km^{2}) of a tract known as "Beal Christie" from his parents, and took to farming it. It was located east of today's New Hampshire Avenue near where it crosses Randolph Road.

In the 1790s, Peter Kemp built a saw and grist mill on Paint Branch where it is crossed by today's Randolph Road. The mill was rebuilt twice, and what is seen today in Valley Mill Park is the 1879 mill built by Franklin Pilling, which ceased to operate by 1930.

The earliest recorded use of the "Colesville" name was on January 25, 1806, when the General Assembly of Maryland changed the place of holding elections of the Fourth Election District of Montgomery County to "Edward Berry's, commonly called Coale's-Ville". It is unknown where this name came from, but it may have come from the maiden name of Elizabeth (Coale) Snowden, wife of Richard Snowden who was the owner of "Snowden's Manor" in nearby Sandy Spring and began living there in 1728. By 1824 the name was generally known as "Coalsville", and was sometimes referred to as such even as late as 1906.

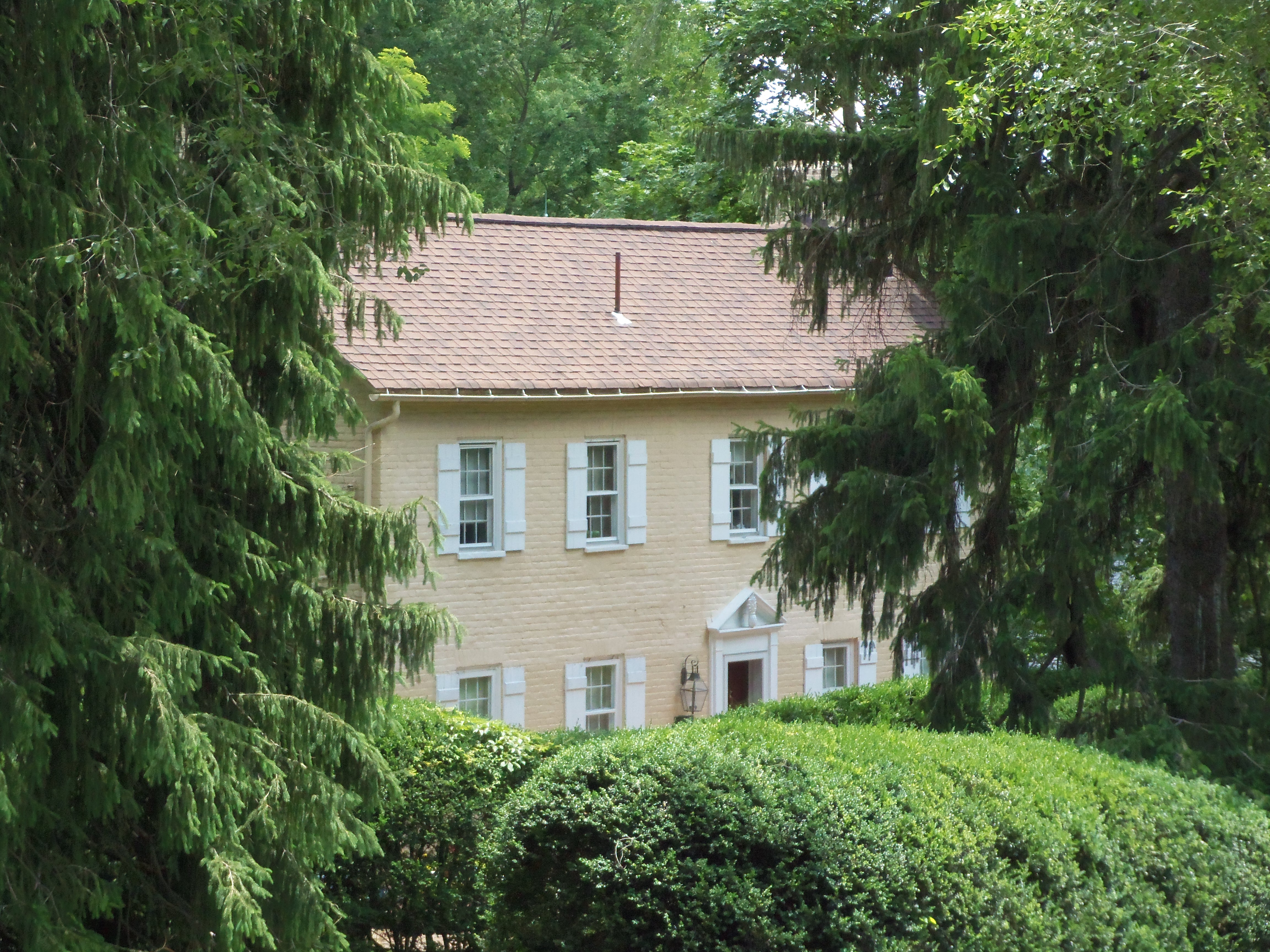
Milimar

The oldest standing house in Colesville is "Milimar" at 410 Randolph Road, which is in the National Register of Historic Places and was built around 1790. It is also known as "The Old Lazanby Home", but was probably built by Samuel and Mary Peach, who purchased the 164.5-acre (0.666 km^{2}) tract it is on known as "Peaches Lot" from Evan Thomas shortly after he freed his slaves.

The New York Times reported that President Franklin Pierce purchased a farm of 600 acres (2.4 km^{2}) in Colesville in 1855.

Joseph F. Burr started purchasing Colesville-area land in 1869. By 1872, he had amassed nearly 1,000 acres (4.0 km^{2}) and lived in a beautiful mansion on the property known as Valley View. The mansion was located on the north side of today's Randolph Road, on the site of today's Holy Family Seminary. Burr was a friend of President Grover Cleveland, who visited Valley View frequently.

An old house built in 1850 is still standing at 13910 Notley Road. It was used as a school by a Miss Laxbenny in the late 1800s and was known as "Drumeldra".

In 1927, the Smithville Colored School was founded in Colesville. It was one of sixteen schools for African Americans constructed in the county with financial assistance from the Julius Rosenwald Fund. It was closed in 1952 when all Montgomery County schools for "colored" children were consolidated.

Colesville United Methodist Church is located in Colesville, Maryland.

The Holy Family Seminary, headquarters of the American Delegation of the catholic order of the Sons of the Holy Family, is also located in Colesville, since 1946.

Colesville hosted the Strawberry Festival every May for over 25 years, ending in 2011. The festival was located at the corner of Hobbes Drive and New Hampshire Avenue. Vendors sold strawberries and ice cream, and volunteers organized carnival games for kids.

On February 6, 2010, Colesville had a record regional snowfall of 40 inches (102 cm).

== Demographics ==
Historical population
Census	Pop.	Note	%±
2000	19,810		—
2010	14,647		−26.1%
2020	15,421		5.3%
U.S. Decennial Census; 2010–2020

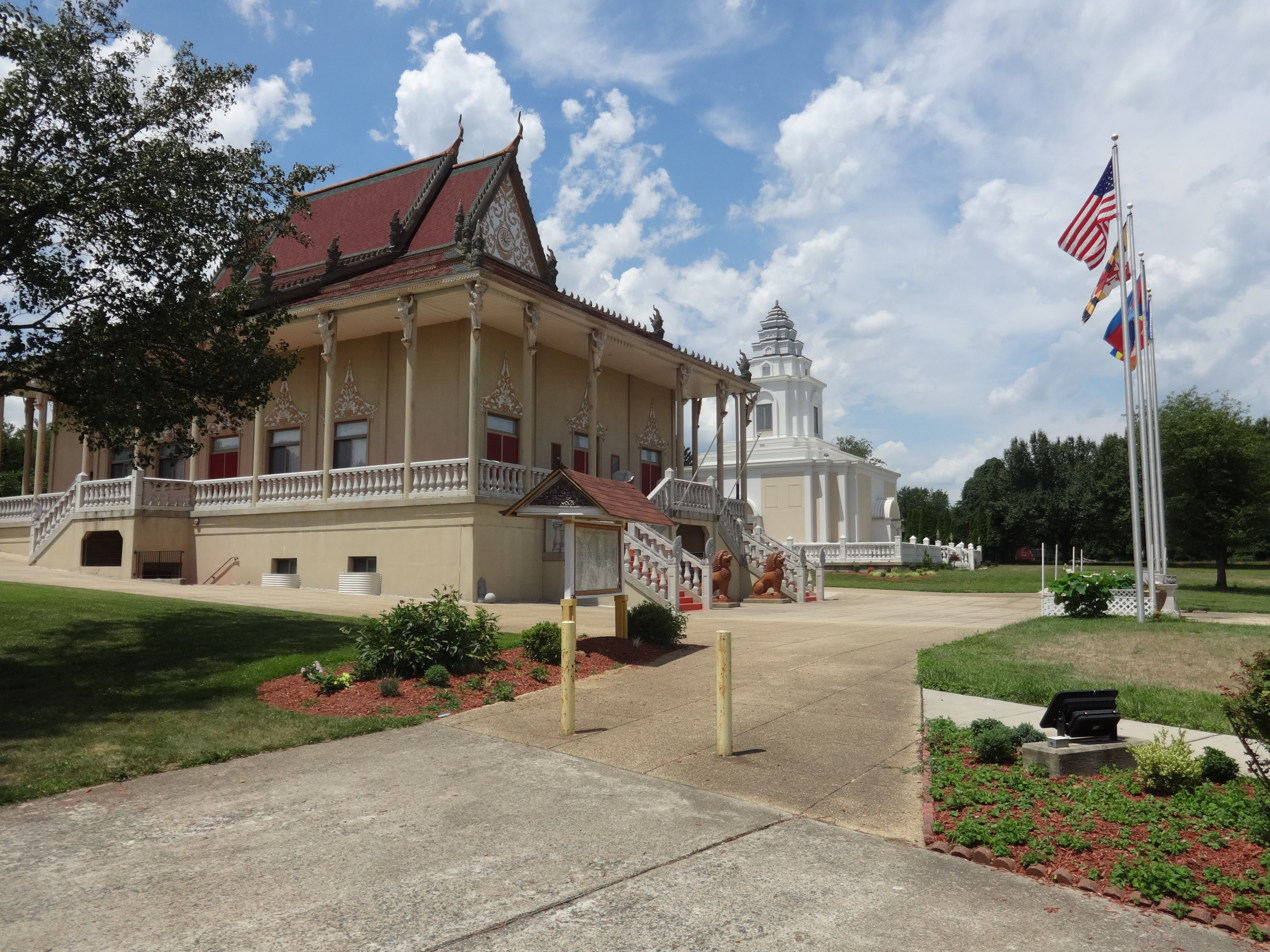
Cambodian Buddhist Society, Inc. of Colesville, July 2016.

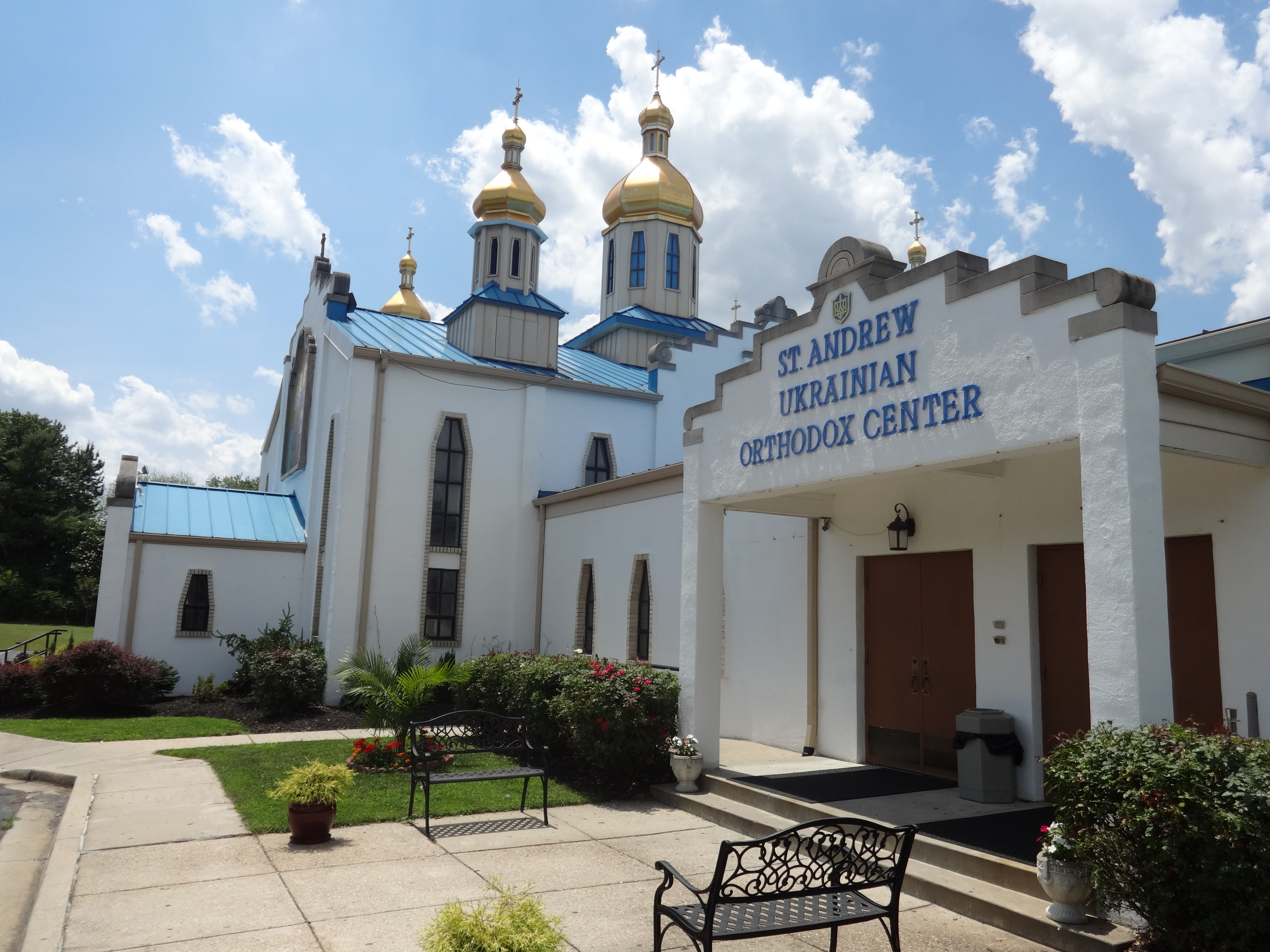
St. Andrew Ukrainian Orthodox Cathedral of Colesville, July 2016.

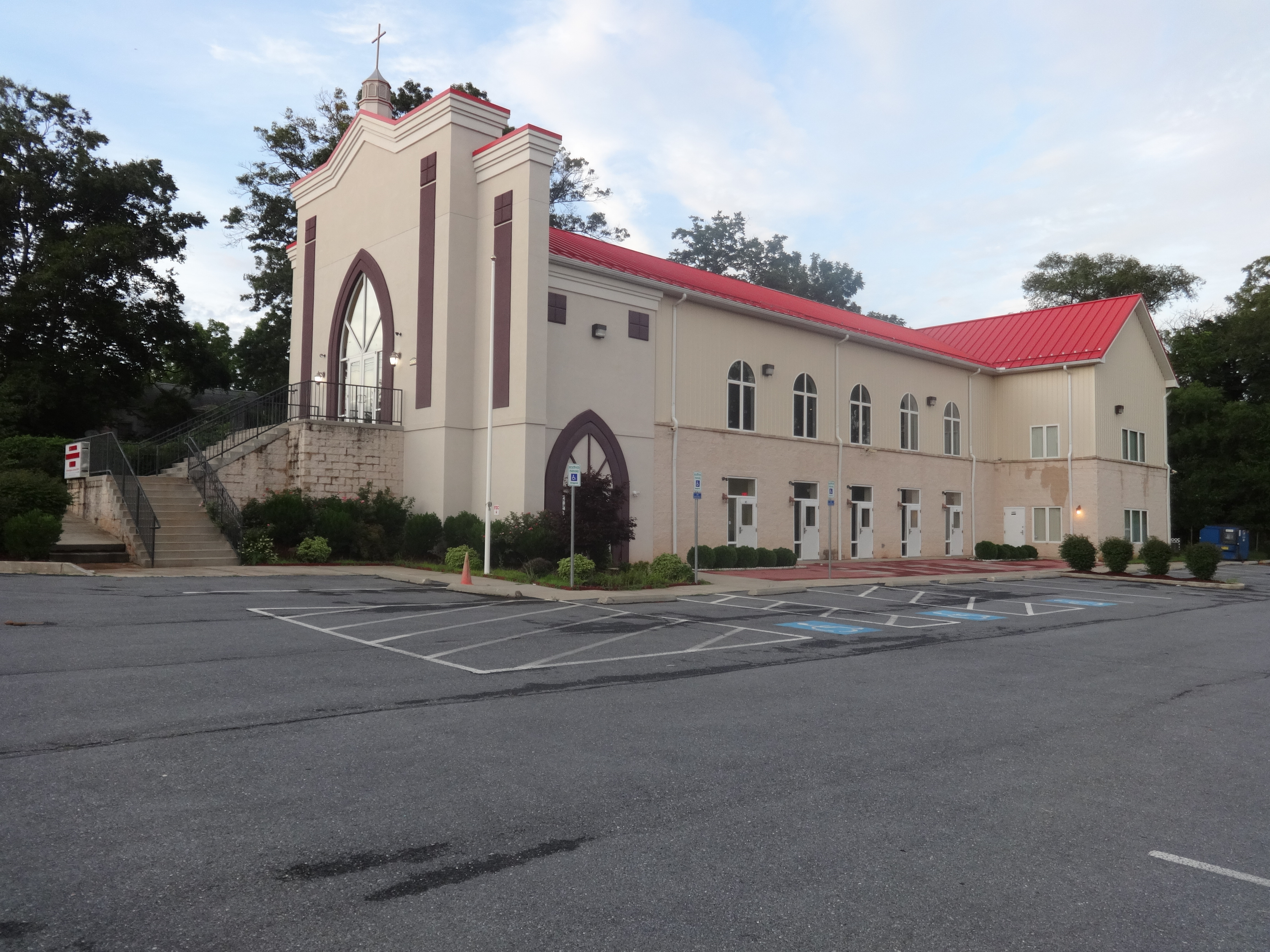
St. Thomas Indian Orthodox Church of Colesville, July 2016.

=== Racial and ethnic composition ===
Colesville CDP, Maryland – Racial and ethnic composition Note: the US Census treats Hispanic/Latino as an ethnic category. This table excludes Latinos from the racial categories and assigns them to a separate category. Hispanics/Latinos may be of any race.
Race / Ethnicity (NH = Non-Hispanic)	Pop 2000	Pop 2010	Pop 2020	% 2000	% 2010	% 2020
White alone (NH)	10,414	5,598	4,609	52.57%	38.22%	29.89%
Black or African American alone (NH)	4,364	4,060	4,606	22.03%	27.72%	29.87%
Native American or Alaska Native alone (NH)	38	17	9	0.19%	0.12%	0.06%
Asian alone (NH)	3,539	2,349	2,370	17.86%	16.04%	15.37%
Native Hawaiian or Pacific Islander alone (NH)	4	1	5	0.02%	0.01%	0.03%
Other race alone (NH)	44	68	106	0.22%	0.46%	0.69%
Mixed race or Multiracial (NH)	459	378	691	2.32%	2.58%	4.48%
Hispanic or Latino (any race)	948	2,176	3,025	4.79%	14.86%	19.62%
Total	19,810	14,647	15,421	100.00%	100.00%	100.00%

=== 2020 census ===
As of the 2020 census, Colesville had a population of 15,421. The median age was 46.1 years. 19.8% of residents were under the age of 18 and 23.8% of residents were 65 years of age or older. For every 100 females there were 94.5 males, and for every 100 females age 18 and over there were 91.5 males age 18 and over.

100.0% of residents lived in urban areas, while 0.0% lived in rural areas.

There were 4,947 households in Colesville, of which 31.6% had children under the age of 18 living in them. Of all households, 60.3% were married-couple households, 12.2% were households with a male householder and no spouse or partner present, and 23.8% were households with a female householder and no spouse or partner present. About 18.5% of all households were made up of individuals and 12.1% had someone living alone who was 65 years of age or older.

There were 5,142 housing units, of which 3.8% were vacant. The homeowner vacancy rate was 0.6% and the rental vacancy rate was 11.4%.

Racial composition as of the 2020 census
Race	Number	Percent
White	4,935	32.0%
Black or African American	4,673	30.3%
American Indian and Alaska Native	76	0.5%
Asian	2,392	15.5%
Native Hawaiian and Other Pacific Islander	5	0.0%
Some other race	1,554	10.1%
Two or more races	1,786	11.6%

=== 2010 census ===
As of the 2010 United States census, Colesville's population was 44.8% White, 28.3% African-American, 0.3% American Indian or Alaska Native, 16.1% Asian, 0.0% Native Hawaiian or Pacific Islander, 6.6% from some other race and 3.9% from two or more races. 14.9% of the population was Hispanic or Latino (of any race). White Hispanics/Latinos and Hispanics/Latinos from some other race comprised 6.6% and 6.1% of Colesville's population, respectively. 38.2% of Colesville's residents are non-Hispanic White Americans, 27.7% are non-Hispanic African Americans and 16% are non-Hispanic Asian Americans.

As of 2010, Colesville's Hispanic and Latino population was 46% Central American, 35% being of Salvadoran descent and 6% being of Guatemalan descent. 21% of Colesville's Hispanic/Latino population was of South American descent (6% were Peruvian), 8% were of Mexican descent, 6% were of Peruvian descent, 5% were of Puerto Rican descent, 4% were of Cuban descent, 3% were of Dominican descent, and 3% were of Spaniard descent.

=== 2000 census ===
As of the 2000 census, there were 19,810 people, 6,525 households, and 5,526 families residing in the area. The population density was 2,144.4 inhabitants per square mile (828.0/km^{2}). There were 6,615 housing units at an average density of 716.1 per square mile (276.5/km^{2}). The racial makeup of the area was 55.33% White, 22.25% African American, 0.23% Native American, 17.93% Asian, 0.02% Pacific Islander, 1.52% from other races, and 2.72% from two or more races. Hispanic or Latino of any race were 4.79% of the population. 9% of Colesville's residents were German, 9% Irish, 8% English, 5% Korean, 4% Indian, 4% Italian, 4% Chinese, 4% Polish, 3% Russian, 2% Subsaharan African, 2% West Indian and 2% Vietnamese. People of Greek, Filipino, Scottish, Scotch-Irish, Arab, Swedish, French, Central American, Nigerian, South American, Dutch, Jamaican, Salvadoran, Iranian, Pakistani, Norwegian and Cambodian descent each comprise 1% of the population.

There were 6,525 households, out of which 37.1% had children under the age of 18 living with them, 73.1% were married couples living together, 9.0% had a female householder with no husband present, and 15.3% were non-families. 12.3% of all households were made up of individuals, and 5.7% had someone living alone who was 65 years of age or older. The average household size was 3.02 and the average family size was 3.28.

In the area the population was spread out, with 25.1% under the age of 18, 6.7% from 18 to 24, 23.0% from 25 to 44, 31.5% from 45 to 64, and 13.7% who were 65 years of age or older. The median age was 42 years. For every 100 females, there were 94.7 males. For every 100 females age 18 and over, there were 90.7 males.

=== Income and poverty ===
The median income for a household (2016) in the immediate area (one-mile radius of Randolph Rd & New Hampshire Ave) is $135,397 (pop. 9,149), and $115,604 for a three-mile radius from town center (pop. 90,801).
