= Paint Branch =

Stream in Maryland, US

Coordinates: 38.978722°N 76.916641°W

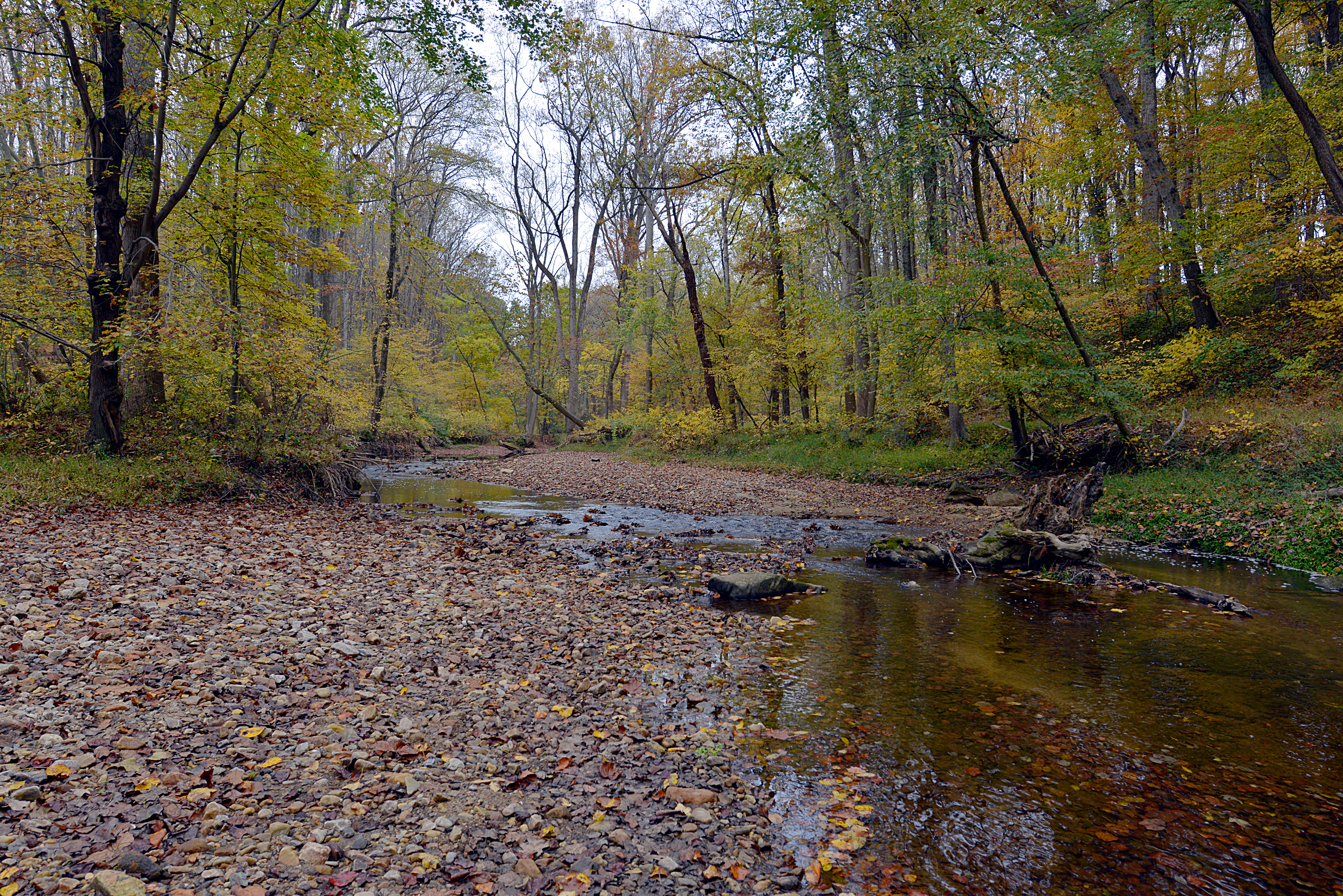

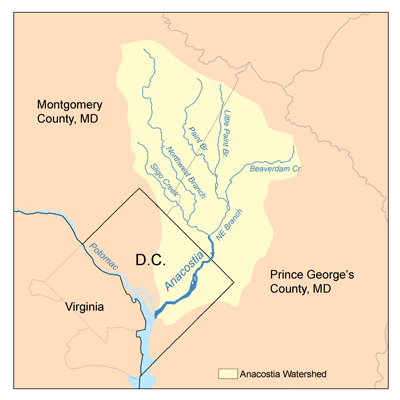
- Map of the Anacostia River watershed showing Paint Branch

Location
- Country: United States
- Location: Montgomery and Prince George's counties, Maryland

Physical characteristics
- Mouth
  - location: Northeast Branch Anacostia River
- Length: 17.0 miles (27.4 km)
- Basin size: 20.8 square miles (54 km^{2})

Paint Branch is a 17.0-mile-long (27.4 km) tributary stream of the Anacostia River that flows Southeastwards through Montgomery County and Prince George's County, Maryland. Specifically, its primary tributary is of the Northeast Branch, which flows to the Anacostia River, Potomac River and the Chesapeake Bay. The beginning elevation of the stream is 480 feet above sea level and it subsequently drops to 30 feet when its flows meet the Indian Creek in College Park, Maryland.

The headwaters of Paint Branch are located near Spencerville (about 11.5 miles (18.5 km) north of Washington, D.C.) and the stream flows south for 14 miles (23 km) to its confluence with the Northeast Branch. The watershed area is 20.8 square miles (54 km^{2}) and includes portions of the communities of Spencerville, Cloverly, Fairland, Colesville, White Oak and College Park, Maryland.

== Watershed characteristics ==
=== Physical ===
The Paint Branch subwatershed is approximately 13,287 acres (20.7 miles) in size and 18% impervious. The areas along Maryland's route 29, the intersection of Sandy Spring Road, and Columbia Pike in Burtonsville, Maryland have undergone extensive commercial development. Contrasting this, counties that border the watershed's southern-flowing direction (Montgomery and Prince George's), offer the least developed areas.

=== Biological and ecological ===
The Paint Branch tributary stream is classified according to the state of Maryland’s Department of the Environment as Use I and Use III waters. Specifically, the lower partition of the Paint Branch stream is the Use I section, and the upper partition of the stream is Use III. A Use I stream has water contact recreations and the protection of nontidal warmwater aquatic life. In so many words, this means that leisure occurs in these areas, while the growth of fish and other wildlife is protected. A Use III water expands on this concept, by categorically facilitating the growth and propagation of the trout species. Thus, in the upper parts of the Paint Branch stream, naturally reproducing brown trout are one of the most significant aquatic species in the community.

== Tributaries ==
- Left Fork
- Right Fork
- Gum Springs Tributary
- Good Hope Tributary
- Snowden's Mill Branch
- Fairland Farms
- Columbia Park Tributary
- Hollywood Branch
- Martin Luther King Tributary
- Tanley Road Tributary
- Stewart-April Lane Tributary
- West Farm Branch
- Little Paint Branch
- Indian Creek

== Recreation ==
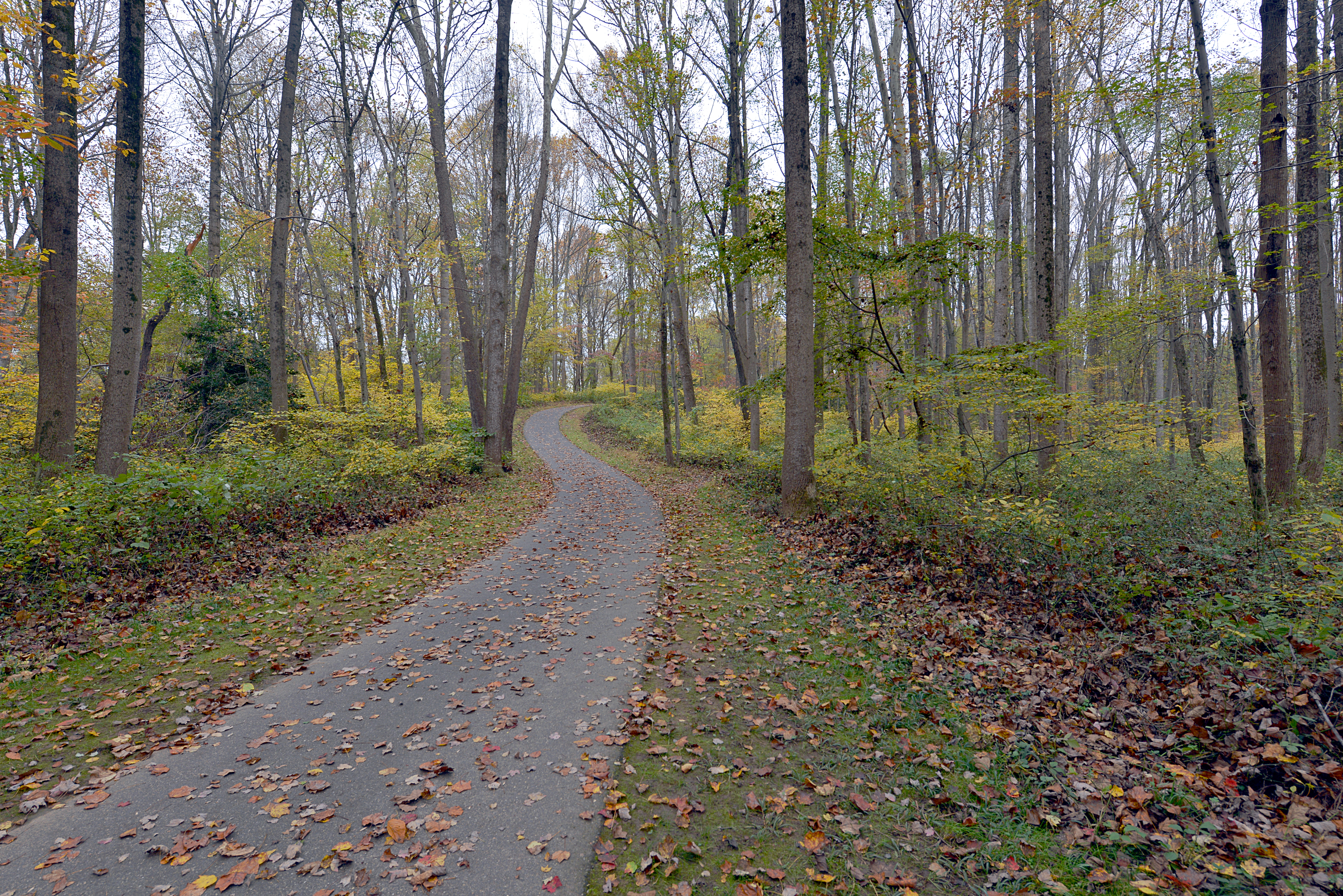
Paint Branch Trail in Montgomery County, MD

There are two trails along the Paint Branch stream which holistically make up the Paint Branch Trail. One is a 3-mile hard surface trail in Montgomery County that runs from Martin Luther King Jr. Recreational Park to Fairland Road with a trail extension in progress to take the trail to Old Columbia Pike. The other is part of the Anacostia Tributary Trail System in Prince George's County and goes from Lake Artemesia to Cherry Hill Road.

== See also ==
- List of Maryland rivers
