= Milimar =

Historic house in Maryland, United States

- U.S. National Register of Historic Places
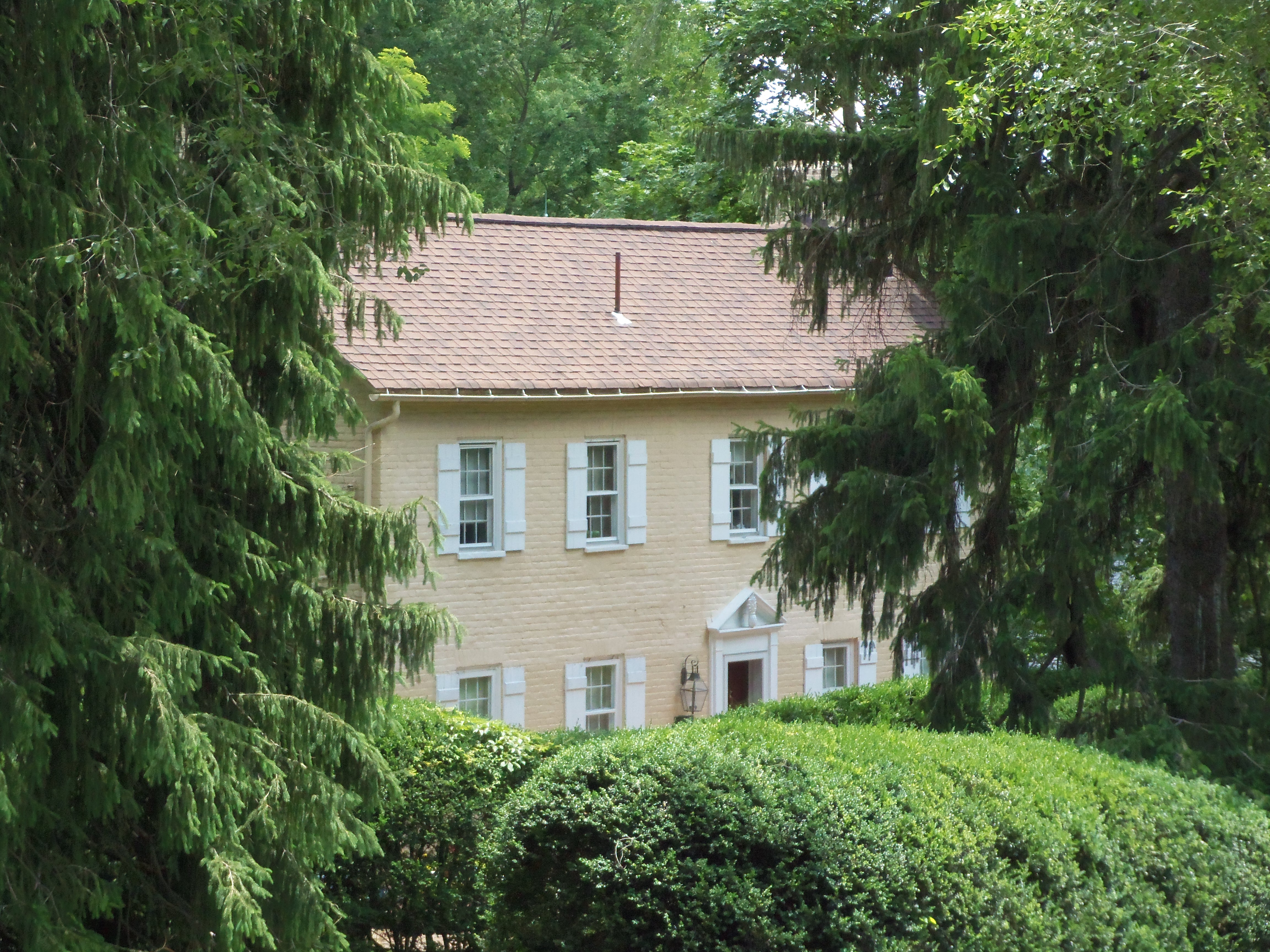
- The house from Randolph Road

- Location within Maryland Location within the United States
- Location: 410 Randolph Rd. Silver Spring, Maryland
- Coordinates: 39°4′3″N 77°1′7″W
- Area: 1.3 acres (0.53 ha)
- Built: 1790
- Architectural style: Georgian
- NRHP reference No.: 73000935
- Added to NRHP: April 13, 1973

Milimar is a historic home located in Silver Spring, Montgomery County, Maryland, United States. Milimar is a 2 1/2-story brick house that is Georgian in style. The house is believed to have been built by Henry Lazenby II, a descendant of a family which came to Maryland at the very beginning of the 18th century.

Milimar was listed on the National Register of Historic Places in 1973.
