= List of schools in Prince George's County, Maryland =

Prince George's County Public Schools (PGCPS) is a large school district administered by the government of Prince George's County, Maryland, United States and is overseen by the Maryland State Department of Education. With approximately 127,129 students enrolled for the 2009–10 school year, the Prince George's County Public Schools system is the second largest school district in the state of Maryland; the third largest school district in both the Washington Metropolitan Area and Baltimore-Washington Metropolitan Area; and it's the 18th largest school district in the nation.

PGCPS operates a total of 196 schools which includes 127 elementary schools, 36 middle schools, and 24 high schools with 8 special centers, 2 vocational centers, and the Howard B. Owens Science Center, serving students from Pre-Kindergarten through Grade 12

== Public schools ==
=== High schools ===
- Bladensburg High School
- Bowie High School
- Central High School
- Crossland High School
- Frederick Douglass High School
- DuVal High School
- Fairmont Heights High School
- Charles Herbert Flowers High School
- Friendly High School
- Gwynn Park High School
- High Point High School
- Largo High School
- Laurel High School
- Northwestern High School
- Oxon Hill High School
- Parkdale High School
- Potomac High School
- Eleanor Roosevelt High School
- Suitland High School
- Surrattsville High School
- Dr. Henry A. Wise, Jr. High School

=== Middle schools ===
- Buck Lodge Middle School
- Charles Carroll Middle School
- CMIT North Middle School
- Stephen Decatur Middle School and Community Center
- Drew-Freeman Middle School
- Dwight D. Eisenhower Middle School
- Benjamin D. Foulois Creative and Performing Arts Academy
- G. James Gholson Middle School
- Robert Goddard French Immersion School
- Robert Goddard Montessori School
- Isaac J. Gourdine Middle School
- Greenbelt Middle School
- Gwynn Park Middle School
- John Hanson French Immersion School
- John Hanson Montessori School
- Hyattsville Middle School
- Thomas Johnson Middle School
- Dr. Ernest Everett Just Middle School
- Kenmoor Middle School
- Kettering Middle School
- Martin Luther King, Jr. Middle School
- James Madison Middle School
- Thurgood G. Marshall Middle School
- Samuel Ogle Middle School
- Nicholas Orem Middle School
- Oxon Hill Middle School
- Edgar Allan Poe Academy
- Thomas G. Pullen Creative and Performing Arts Magnet School
- Benjamin Stoddert Middle School
- Benjamin Tasker Middle School
- Walker Mill Middle School
- William Wirt Middle School

=== Combined K-8 schools ===
- The Accokeek Academy
- Beltsville Academy
- William W. Hall Academy
- Andrew Jackson Academy
- Samuel P. Massie Academy

Imagine Leeland at Foundations Public Charter Schools

=== Elementary schools ===
- Adelphi Elementary School
- Allenwood Elementary School
- Apple Grove Elementary School
- Ardmore Elementary School
- Arrowhead Elementary School
- Avalon Elementary School
- Baden Elementary School and Community Center
- Barack Obama Elementary School (Opening August 2010)
- Barnaby Manor Elementary School
- John H. Bayne Elementary School
- Beacon Heights Elementary School
- William Beanes Elementary School and Community Center
- Berwyn Heights Elementary School
- Bladensburg Elementary School
- Bond Mill Elementary School
- Bradbury Heights Elementary School
- Brandywine Elementary
- Doswell E. Brooks Elementary School
- Calverton Elementary School
- Capitol Heights Elementary School
- Carmody Hills Elementary School
- Carole Highlands Elementary School
- Carrollton Elementary School
- Samuel Chase Elementary School
- Cesar Chavez Elementary School
- Cherokee Lane Elementary School
- Chillum Elementary School
- Thomas Claggett Elementary School
- Clinton Grove Elementary School
- Columbia Park Elementary School and Community Center
- Concord Elementary School
- Cool Spring Elementary School
- Cooper Lane Elementary School
- Deerfield Run Elementary School and Community Center
- J. Frank Dent Elementary School
- District Heights Elementary School
- Dodge Park Elementary School
- Francis T. Evans Elementary School
- Flintstone Elementary School
- Forest Heights Elementary School
- Fort Foote Elementary School
- Fort Washington Forest Elementary School
- Benjamin D. Foulois Creative and Performing Arts Academy
- Robert Frost Elementary School
- Gaywood Elementary School
- Glassmanor Elementary School and Community Center
- Glenarden Woods Elementary School
- Glenn Dale Elementary School
- Glenridge Elementary School
- Robert Goddard French Immersion School
- Robert Goddard Montessori School
- Robert R. Gray Elementary School
- Greenbelt Elementary School
- James H. Harrison Elementary School
- Heather Hills Elementary School
- High Bridge Elementary School
- Highland Park Elementary School
- Hillcrest Heights Elementary School
- Hollywood Elementary School
- Hyattsville Elementary School
- Indian Queen Elementary School and Community Center
- Mary Harris "Mother" Jones" Elementary School
- Kenilworth Elementary School
- Kenmoor Elementary School
- Kettering Elementary School
- Kingsford Elementary School
- Lake Arbor Elementary School
- Lamont Elementary School
- Langley Park-McCormick Elementary School
- Laurel Elementary School
- Lewisdale Elementary School
- Longfields Elementary School
- Magnolia Elementary School
- Marlton Elementary School
- Mattaponi Elementary School
- Melwood Elementary School
- Montpelier Elementary School
- Mount Rainier Elementary School
- North Forestville Elementary School
- Northview Elementary School
- Oakcrest Elementary School
- Oaklands Elementary School
- Overlook Elementary School
- Oxon Hill Elementary School
- William Paca Elementary School
- Paint Branch Elementary School
- Panorama Elementary School
- Rosa L. Parks Elementary School
- Patuxent Elementary School
- Perrywood Elementary School
- Pointer Ridge Elementary School
- Port Towns Elementary School
- Potomac Landing Elementary School and Community Center
- Princeton Elementary School
- James Ryder Randall Elementary School
- Catherine T. Reed Elementary School
- Ridgecrest Elementary School
- Riverdale Elementary School
- Rockledge Elementary School
- Rogers Heights Elementary School
- Rosaryville Elementary School
- Rose Valley Elementary School
- Scotchtown Hills Elementary School
- Seabrook Elementary School
- Seat Pleasant Elementary School
- Skyline Elementary School
- Springhill Lake Elementary School
- Suitland Elementary School
- Tayac Elementary School
- Templeton Elementary School
- Tulip Grove Elementary School
- University Park Elementary School
- Valley View Elementary School
- Vansville Elementary School and Community Center
- Waldon Woods Elementary School
- Whitehall Elementary School
- Phyllis E. Williams Elementary School
- Woodmore Elementary School
- Woodridge Elementary School
- Judge Sylvania W. Woods, Sr. Elementary School
- Yorktown Elementary School

=== Magnet schools ===
Magnet schools provide a wide range of special or unique subjects, activities and/or learning opportunities, as an enhancement to the Prince George's County Public Schools comprehensive programs.

- The Accokeek Academy
- Berwyn Heights Elementary School
- Capitol Heights Elementary School
- Glenarden Woods Elementary School
- Heather Hills Elementary School
- Kenmoor Elementary School
- Longfields Elementary School
- Oakcrest Elementary School
- Valley View Elementary School
- Stephen Decatur Middle School and Community Center
- Benjamin D. Foulois Creative and Performing Arts Academy
- Dora Kennedy French Immersion School
- Robert Goddard Montessori School
- John Hanson French Immersion School
- John Hanson Montessori School
- Hyattsville Middle School
- Kenmoor Middle School
- Thomas G. Pullen Creative and Performing Arts Magnet School
- Walker Mill Middle School
- Bladensburg High School
- Central High School
- Crossland High School
- Fairmont Heights High School
- Charles Herbert Flowers High School
- Largo High School
- Laurel High School
- Oxon Hill High School
- Parkdale High School
- Eleanor Roosevelt High School
- Suitland High School
- Dr. Henry A. Wise, Jr. High School

== Private schools ==
- Alternative High School
- Ascension Lutheran School (K-8)
- The Beddow School
- Bishop McNamara High School
- Capitol Christian Academy
- Clinton Christian School
- Croom Vocational School
- DeMatha Catholic High School
- Elizabeth Seton High School
- Fairhaven School (Upper Marlboro, Maryland)
- Florence Bertell Academy of Prince George's County
- Grace Christian School
- High Road Academy of Prince George's County
- High Road Upper School of Prince George's County
- Jericho Christian Academy
- Lanham Christian School
- Leary School
- New Hope Academy
- Queen Anne School
- Riverdale Baptist School (K3-12)
- St. Ann's High School
- St. Ignatius Loyola School
- St. Jerome Academy, Hyattsville (PreK-8)
- St. Mary's School of Piscataway (K-8)
- St. Vincent Pallotti High School
- Tall Oaks Vocational School
- The Maryland International Day School
- Woodstream Christian Academy, Mitchelleville, Maryland

== See also ==
- Prince George's County Public Schools
- List of Prince George's County Public Schools Middle Schools
- Prince George's County Public Schools Magnet Programs
