= List of Prince George's County Public Schools middle schools =

This article provides details on the middle schools within the Prince George's County Public Schools system, in the U.S. State of Maryland.

Middle schools operate as 6th–8th grade middle schools. Some middle schools are part of combined PreK-8th grade elementary/middle schools, and are referred to as "Academies". Grades 7–9 junior high schools were completely phased out in the mid-1980s. Recent efforts have been made to convert most middle schools to the more popular grades 6–8 model. Issues in the past such as over-enrollment, lack of classroom space, and funding, had made it hard to convert all middle schools to a grades 6–8 configuration, but with increased funding and the addition of new middle schools, the transition is slowly being made to be completed by SY2024–2025.

Most middle schools in Prince George's County operate with a "comprehensive" model as their base. Most students are assigned to a middle school based on an "attendance area". Most magnet programs are run as a "school-within-a-school" model, where the magnet serves as an alternative program — in addition to the main comprehensive program — and students from outside the regular attendance area of the middle school are enrolled and accepted into the magnet, either through continuity (automatic continuation from an elementary school magnet program to the middle school level equivalent) or more commonly, through a "magnet lottery", where students apply for a magnet program and are granted acceptance through a random drawing. Almost all middle schools have a whole-school "signature program" that includes a specialized program of instruction which is the foundation of the school's comprehensive program.

All middle schools in the PGCPS operate on a staggered school day schedule, where some middle schools start as early as 7:45 am and the end as early as 2:25 pm, and other middle schools start as late as 9:30 am and end as late as 4:10 pm. All middle schools operate on a modified block scheduling system, where some classes meet for as long as 70 minutes, daily.

In a cooperative effort of the county government, Board of Education, and the Maryland-National Capital Park & Planning Commission (M-NCPPC), some M-NCPPC community centers are physically connected to middle schools throughout the district. The unique community park/school centers currently features shared use areas which include a gymnasium, multi-purpose room, exercise/fitness room, dance room, arts and crafts room, computer lab, offices, storage areas, patio area, and restrooms. There are tennis courts and unlighted fields located on-site at select centers.

== The Accokeek Academy ==
The Accokeek Academy

Location
- Accokeek, Maryland; United States; 38.688056°N 76.979168°W

Information
- Website: www.pgcps.org/accokeek/

The Accokeek Academy (Area 4, District 5, grades 6–8) is a Talented and Gifted Center magnet school, located in Accokeek. The Accokeek Academy was instituted in the fall of 2009 as part of the PGCPS school consolidation effort. Under the initiative, Eugene Burroughs Middle School and neighboring Henry G. Ferguson Elementary School were combined to create The Accokeek Academy. The school's name was decided after input from the community that the two schools serve.

At the middle school-level, the principal is Judy Adams. The school hours are 9:30 am – 4:10 pm. There are roughly 700 students enrolled in grades 6–8. The school currently has a uniform policy in place.

The Talented and Gifted Magnet Program at the Accokeek Academy is designed to provide accelerated learning for highly gifted students. The program functions as a "school-within-a-school," where the magnet serves as a secondary program to the main comprehensive program. Admission into the TAG magnet program is through specialized TAG admissions testing only.

In 2009, 73.6% and 52% of all students in Grades 6–8 tested proficient in reading and mathematics, respectively, based on scores from the state-administered MSAs. 32% of all students were eligible for the government-funded free and reduced lunch program.

Approximately half of all students attend high school at Friendly High School, while the other half attend Gwynn Park High School.

== Beltsville Academy ==
Beltsville Academy

Location
- Beltsville, Maryland; United States; 39.038678°N 76.918604°W

Information
- Opened: 8:30
- Closed: 3:10
- Principal: Leslie Lowe
- Grades: PreK - 8
- Website: www.pgcps.org/beltsville/

Beltsville Academy (Area 1; District 1, grades PreK-8) is a pre-kindergarten through 8th grade academy, located in Beltsville.

Beltsville Academy operated as Beltsville Elementary School and prior to that, as Beltsville Academic Center (when Beltsville housed the now eliminated Academic Center magnet program), until the 2008–09 school year, when it was converted to a pre-kindergarten through 8th grade school. The middle school comprises grades six through eight. The principal is Leslie Lowe. The school hours are 8:30 am to 3:10 pm. This school does not currently have a uniform policy.

Beltsville Academy is a feeder school to High Point High School.

== Buck Lodge Middle School ==
Buck Lodge Middle School

Location
- United States; 39.010681°N 76.960672°W

Information
- Website: www.pgcps.org/bucklodge/

Buck Lodge Middle School (Area 1, District 2, grades 6–8) is a Title I comprehensive school located in Adelphi. The principal is James Richardson. The school hours are 8:30 am to 3:10 pm. Roughly 643 students are enrolled. There is a mandatory uniform policy in effect at this school.

As of 2009, 69.1% and 56.2% of all students were proficient in reading and mathematics, respectively, as determined by the statewide MSA assessments.

Buck Lodge Middle School mainly only serves the communities of Adelphi and Langley Park.

Langley Park McCormick Elementary School, Mary Harris Mother Jones Elementary School, Cool Spring Elementary School, Adelphi Elementary School, and Cherokee Lane Elementary School are all feeder schools into Buck Lodge Middle School. Buck Lodge Middle School then feeds into High Point High School.

== Charles Carroll Middle School ==
Charles Carroll Middle School

Location
- New Carrollton, Maryland; United States; 38.967542°N 76.881300°W

Information
- Website: www.pgcps.org/charlescarroll/

Charles Carroll Middle School (Area 1, District 1, grades 6–8) is a Title I comprehensive middle school, located in New Carrollton. The school is named after Charles Carroll of Carrollton, a lawyer, delegate to the Continental Congress, and later United States Senator for Maryland.

The principal is David G. Curry Jr. There is currently a mandatory uniform policy in effect at CCMS. There are 743 students enrolled in grades seven and eight. 81% of students are African American, 14% Hispanic, 3% are Caucasian, and 2% are identified as Asian/Pacific Islander. 58.8% of the students qualify for the government-sponsored free or reduced lunch program, in contrast to 45.3% within the district, and a 30.7% statewide average.

In 2009, 62.5% and 41.1% of all students tested proficient in reading and mathematics, respectively, based on scores from the state administered MSAs. Carroll features the school-wide America's Choice School Design Signature Program which serves as the foundation for the school's comprehensive program.

Charles Carroll Middle School primarily serves the community of New Carrollton and a small portion of Lanham.

Lamont Elementary School, Carrollton Elementary School, and Robert M. Frost Elementary School are the only three feeder schools into Charles Carroll Middle School. Charles Carroll Middle School then feeds into Parkdale High School.

== Stephen Decatur Middle School ==
Stephen Decatur Middle School

Location
- Clinton, Maryland; United States; 38.776754°N 76.908283°W

Information
- Website: www.pgcps.org/stephendecatur/

Stephen Decatur Middle School (Area 4, District 4, grades 6–8, Weblink) is a Talented and Gifted Center magnet school and community center, located in Clinton. The school is named after Stephen Decatur, who was an American Naval officer notable for his heroism in the First and Second Barbary Wars and in the War of 1812. He was the youngest man to reach the rank of captain in the history of the United States Navy, and the first American celebrated as a national military hero who had not played a role in the American Revolution.

The principal is Charity McGruder. The school hours are 9:30 am to 4:10 pm. There are 658 students enrolled across three grade levels. There is uniform policy currently in effect at this school.

Stephen Decatur hosts a Talented and Gifted (TAG) magnet program that functions as a "school-within-a-school," where the TAG magnet program is a secondary program to the school's main comprehensive program. Students are placed into the program through either TAG testing or through continuity, where a student has previously been enrolled in a TAG magnet elementary school and they are automatically placed into a TAG magnet program at the middle school level. Dectaur also features the AVID Signature Program.

In 2009, 67.7% and 43.3% of all students tested proficient in reading and mathematics, respectively, as determined by the state administered MSAs. 38.3% of students qualified for the government-funded free or reduced lunch program.

In a cooperative effort of the county government, Board of Education, and the Maryland-National Capital Park & Planning Commission (M-NCPPC), Stephen Decatur has a community/recreation center physically connected to it.

Stephen Decatur Middle School feeds into Clinton High School.

== Drew-Freeman Middle School ==
Drew-Freeman Middle School

Location
- Suitland, Maryland; United States; 38.854940°N 76.919500°W

Information
- Website: www1.pgcps.org/drewfreeman/

Drew-Freeman Middle School (Area 3, District 3, grades 6–8, Weblink) is a comprehensive school located in Suitland. The principal is LeTrecia Gloster. The school hours are 7:45 am to 2:50 pm. There are approximate 843 students enrolled as of September 2009. There is a mandatory uniform policy in place at this school.

Drew-Freeman was originally established as Francis Scott Key Junior High School. The school relocated to its current location at what used to be known as LaReine High School, an all-girls Catholic school. The school had also been designated a science, mathematics, and technology magnet school for a number of years prior to the relocation. LaReine High School was shuttered in 1992 and stood unoccupied until the school was reopened as a public middle school.

Dr. Jesse L. Freeman Jr. was then principal at Francis Scott Key, who died in 1994. He had been instrumental in the implementation of the science, mathematics, and technology center at Francis Scott Key and several other schools throughout the county. Upon relocating to the former LaReine High School facility, the community wanted to rename Francis Scott Key after famed African-American physician and medical researcher, Dr. Charles R. Drew. Others wanted to rename the school after f Freeman. A compromise was made and the facility was named Drew-Freeman Middle School.

The science, mathematics, and technology magnet program was eliminated at Drew-Freeman and at all other locations within PGCPS, in 2006. This left Drew-Freeman as a comprehensive school with the America's Choice School Design Signature Program.

As of 2009, 56.4% and 30.1% of all students were proficient in reading and mathematics, as determined by the state administered MSAs. 62.1% of all students qualified for the government-funded free or reduced lunch program.

District Heights Elementary School, Suitland Elementary School, Edgar Allan Poe Elementary School, Bradbury Heights Elementary School, Morningside Elementary School, William Beanes Elementary School, and Forestville Elementary School all feed into either Drew-Freeman Middle School, or the Andrew Jackson Academy. Both Middle Schools then feed into Suitland High School.

== Dwight D. Eisenhower Middle School ==
List of Prince George's County Public Schools middle schools

Location
- Laurel, Maryland; United States; 39.079379°N 76.854000°W

Information
- Website: www.pgcps.org/dwightdeisenhower/

Dwight D. Eisenhower Middle School (Area 1, District 1, grades 6–8, Weblink) is a comprehensive middle school located in the Prince George's County side of Laurel. The school is named after the 34th President of the United States, Dwight D. Eisenhower. The principal is John Mangrum. The school hours are 9:30 am to 4:10 pm. There are approximately 744 students enrolled as of September 2009. This school has a mandatory uniform policy in effect.

74.5% and 55.4% of all students tested proficient in reading and mathematics, respectively, as indicated by scores on the state administered MSAs, in 2009. 53.9% of all students qualified for the government-funded free or reduced lunch program.

Eisenhower students go on to Laurel High School for their high school studies.

== Benjamin D. Foulois Creative and Performing Arts Academy ==
Benjamin D. Foulois Creative and Performing Arts Academy

Location
- Suitland, Maryland; United States; 38.826891°N 76.887233°W

Information
- Website: www.pgcps.org/benjaminfoulois/

The Benjamin D. Foulois Creative and Performing Arts Academy (Area 4, District 4, grades K-8, Weblink) is a dedicated Creative and Performing Arts magnet school located in Suitland. The current principal is Dr. Patricia Payne. The school is named after Benjamin Delahauf Foulois, a former United States Army officer who learned to fly the first military planes purchased from the Wright Brothers. He became the first military aviator as an airship pilot, and achieved numerous other military aviation "firsts". He led strategic development of the Air Force in the United States.

Foulois originally opened as an elementary school which traces its routes within PGCPS by several decades, but its current status as a K–8 arts magnet school is new, having opened its doors for the first time in August 2009.

Foulois is a dedicated K–8 magnet school, which means that all students who attend the school participate in the school's magnet program. The Creative and Performing Arts magnet program is a competitive program that is open to qualified students from kindergarten through grade 8. Students are admitted into the middle school program, at the sixth grade, through a competitive audition process on a space-available basis.

Eighth graders at Benjamin D. Foulois have the option of auditioning for the Center for the Visual and Performing Arts magnet program at Suitland High School for continuing education in the arts.

== G. James Gholson Middle School ==
G. James Gholson Middle School

Location
- 900 Nalley Road, Landover; Maryland 20785; United States; 38.902932°N 76.875168°W

Information
- Type: Public School
- Motto: Be Responsible, Be Respectful and Be Ready
- Established: August 2002
- Superintendent: Dr. Monica Goldson
- Principal: Marcus Young
- Grades: 6-8
- Enrollment: 863
- Colors: Black, Gold and Navy Blue
- Team name: Knights
- Website: www1.pgcps.org/gjamesgholson/

G. James Gholson Middle School (Area 2, District 3, grades 6–8, Weblink) is a comprehensive middle school located in Landover.

The school is named after G. James Gholson, a scholar; master teacher; administrator; and an advocate for the children of Prince George's County who established an enviable record of distinguished service. Gholson served as Administrative Assistant to the Assistant Superintendent for Secondary Education, where he was the master architect of the system-wide desegregation plan, and played a key role in the implementation process. He was recognized in Newsweek Magazine for his role as the architect and engineer of the desegregation plan and co-authored an evaluation instrument for administrators in Prince George's County Public Schools, which has been replicated in the public schools in Louisville, Kentucky; New Castle and Wilmington, Delaware; Laurel, Mississippi; and Seattle, Washington.

The school is unique in that it was the first purpose-built combined elementary and middle school facility, in the Prince George's County Public Schools system. Gholson shares its facility with Cora L. Rice Elementary School. Gholson's postal address is 900 Nalley Road, while Cora L. Rice's postal address is 950 Nalley Road. The school is led by Mr. Kevin Thompson, Principal and Ms. Mary Compton, Lead Assistant Principal. Approximately 963 students are enrolled at the Gholson. The school hours are from 9:30 am to 4:10 pm. There is a mandatory uniform policy at Gholson Middle School.

The school is divided into Housed academic teams: House of Truth, Justice, Aspiration, Fortitude, Integrity and Wisdom.

As of 2009, 56.6% and 31.4% of all students were proficient in reading and mathematics, as determined by the state administered MSAs. 64.4% of all students were eligible for the federal government administered free and reduced lunch program.

G. James Gholson Middle School primarily serves the communities of Landover, Chapel Oaks, Fairmount Heights, Carmody Hills, and Pepper Mill Village.

Cora L. Rice Elementary School, John Carroll Elementary School, Highland Elementary School, Carmody Hills Elementary School, and Robert R. Gray Elementary School all feed into G. James Gholson Middle School. G. James Gholson Middle School then feeds into Fairmount Heights High School.

== Robert Goddard Montessori School ==
Robert Goddard Montessori School

Location
- Seabrook, Maryland; United States; 38.987743°N 76.842048°W

Information
- Website: www.pgcps.org/robertgoddardmontessori/

Robert Goddard Montessori (Area 2, District 1, grades PreK-8, Weblink) is a dedicated PreK-8 magnet school located in the unincorporated area of Seabrook. The facility is named after the famous U.S. professor of physics and scientist, Robert H. Goddard. The school is located just a short distance from NASA's Goddard Space Flight Center. The principal is Deatrice Womack. As a dedicated magnet school, all students who attend the school participate in the magnet. The school hours are 9:00 am to 3:40 pm. Approximately 513 students are enrolled in the Montessori program. There is no uniform policy currently in effect.

Robert Goddard Montessori's current role as a Montessori magnet school pre-dates its current role, back to when the school was known simply as, Robbert Goddard Middle School, with grades seven and eight. In the mid-2000s, Prince George's County Public Schools completely revamped their magnet schools' programs, and as a result, the Montessori programs at Matthew Henson Elementary School (now closed) and Thomas Johnson Middle School, were consolidated into the current new location at Robert Goddard. Goddard Montessori School share's its space with the Robert Goddard French Immersion School.

The Montessori program provides an interdisciplinary, discovery-based approach to learning. The program was founded by Maria Montessori, who was an Italian physician and anthropologist, created learning activities that interrelate and build upon each other, and are presented sequentially over the years a child spends in the program. The Montessori Middle School Program completes the Montessori studies for students progressing to the seventh and eighth grades. An interdisciplinary teaching team provides the Montessori Program for multidisciplinary learning to include English Language Arts, mathematics, science and social studies.

As of 2009, 89.7% of Montessori middle school seventh and eighth graders were proficient in reading. 84% of Montessori middle school seventh and eighth graders were proficient in mathematics. 20.7% of seventh and eighth graders were eligible for the government-funded free and reduced lunch program.

Robert Goddard Montessori Middle School feeds into Duval High School.

== Greenbelt Middle School ==
Greenbelt Middle School

Location
- Greenbelt, Maryland; United States; 38.997199°N 76.902468°W

Information
- Website: www.pgcps.org/greenbeltms/

Greenbelt Middle School (Ares 2, District 1, grades 6–8, Weblink) is a comprehensive middle school located in Greenbelt. Greenbelt is a former French Immersion magnet school. Its program was relocated to Robert Goddard French Immersion, in 2005. The current principal is Marcellus Clement. The school hours are from 9:00 am to 4:10 pm. Greenbelt had approximately 1356 students enrolled as of September 2019.] This school has a mandatory uniform policy in place.

As of 2009, Greenbelt's students tested 65.8% proficient in reading and 51.2% proficient in mathematics, based on standardized statewide test scores. 63.4% of all students were eligible for the government-funded free and reduced lunch program.

In September 2010, PGCPS officially held a ground-breaking ceremony for a new Greenbelt Middle School. The new school will be the third LEED-certified "green building" in Prince George's County, and have a capacity of 990 students. Greenbelt Middle School was scheduled to open in the fall of 2012.

Greenbelt Middle School primarily serves the communities of Greenbelt, Berwyn Heights, and Westchester Park, as well as most of College Park.

Paint Branch Elementary School, Berwyn Heights Elementary School, Springhill Lake Elementary School, and Greenbelt Elementary School all feed into Greenbelt Middle School. Greenbelt Middle School then feeds into Eleanor Roosevelt High School.

== Gwynn Park Middle School ==
Gwynn Park Middle School

Location
- Brandywine, Maryland; United States; 38.706753°N 76.868790°W

Information
- Type: Public School
- Motto: "Rising Above The Norm"
- Principal: Courtney Forbes
- Grades: 6 - 8
- Colors: Yellow, Black, White
- Team name: Yellow Jackets
- Website: www1.pgcps.org/gwynnparkms/

Gwynn Park Middle School (Area 4, District 5, grades 6–8, Weblink) is a comprehensive middle school located in Brandywine. The principal is Courtney Forbes. Roughly 700 students are enrolled as of September 2012. The school hours are from 7:45 am to 2:25 pm. There is a mandatory uniform policy at this school.

Gwynn Park housed a science, mathematics, and technology magnet program, until the program was eliminated system-wide, in 2005. Gwynn Park currently features the AVID Signature Program.

As of 2012, 71% of all students were proficient in reading and 78.9% of all students were proficient in mathematics. 67.8% of all students were eligible for the government-fund free and reduced lunch program.

Gwynn Park Middle School primarily feeds into Gwynn Park High School, as well as Frederick Douglass High School and Surrattsville High School.

== William W. Hall Academy ==
William W. Hall Academy

Location
- Capitol Heights, Maryland; United States; 38.870696°N 76.919135°W

Information
- Website: www1.pgcps.org/williamwhall/

William W. Hall Academy (Area 3, District 3, grades PreK-8, Weblink) is a combined elementary and middle school, located in Capitol Heights. William Hall is a relatively new facility, and was opened as an elementary school until it was converted to a pre-8th grade academy, in the fall of 2009.

The principal is Darryl Evans. The school hours are 7:45 am to 2:25 pm. This school has a mandatory uniform policy.

Students from William W. Hall feed into Central High School and Suitland High School.

== John Hanson French Immersion School ==
John Hanson French Immersion School

Location
- Oxon Hill, Maryland; United States; 38.802393°N 76.992552°W

Information
- Website: www.pgcps.org/mayaangelou/

John Hanson French Immersion (Area 4, District 4, grades K-8, Weblink) is a dedicated K-8 magnet school, located in Oxon Hill. The school is named after John Hanson, who was a merchant and public official from Maryland during the era of the American Revolution. The principal is Dr. Lysianne Essama. The school hours are from 9:00 am to 3:40 pm. Approximately 366 students were enrolled as of September 2009. There is a mandatory uniform policy in place at this school. As a dedicated magnet school, all students enrolled at the school participate in the full magnet program.

John Hanson French Immersion is a relatively new school with an old background. Prior to becoming a French Immersion magnet school, Hanson operated a kindergarten through grade six comprehensive elementary school. Between 2005 and 2008, the PGCPS Magnet Schools Program underwent a massive overhaul. As part of the overhaul, the French Immersion Magnet Programs at Shadyside Elementary School and Andrew Jackson Middle School, both in Suitland, were relocated and consolidated into one centralized location at the under-enrolled John Hanson facility, in Oxon Hill. John Hanson French Immersion shares its space with the John Hanson Montessori School.

As part of the French Immersion magnet program, students are taught all subjects in French language. The teachers are native French speakers from around the world. Students also study Italian. In addition, Algebra and Geometry are possible options in mathematics. The interdisciplinary approach for English, Art and World Studies includes special themes, seminars, field trips, and a strong focus on essay writing. International travel is an enrichment part of the French Immersion Program.

As of 2009, 81.1% and 83.3% of all students were proficient in reading and mathematics, respectively. 31.8% of all students were eligible to participate in the government-funded free and reduced lunch program.

== John Hanson Montessori School ==
John Hanson Montessori School

Location
- Oxon Hill, Maryland; United States; 38.802393°N 76.992552°W

Information
- Website: www.pgcps.org/johnhansonmontessori/

John Hanson Montessori (Area 4, District 4, grades PreK-8, Weblink) is a dedicated PreK-8 magnet school located in Oxon Hill. The school is named after John Hanson, who was a merchant and public official from Maryland during the era of the American Revolution. As a dedicated magnet school, all students enrolled at the school participate in the full magnet program. The principal is Katrina Pinder. As of September 2009 366 students were enrolled at the school. The school hours are from 9:00 am to 3:40 pm. There is a voluntary uniform policy in place at this school.

John Hanson Montessori's current role as a Montessori magnet school, pre-dates its current role, back to when the school was known simply as, John Hanson Elementary School, with kindergarten through grade eight. In the mid-2000s, Prince George's County Public Schools completely revamped their magnet schools' programs, and as a result, the Montessori programs Doswell E. Brooks and Flintstone Elementary School and Oxon Hill Middle School, were consolidated into the current new location at John Hanson. Hanson Montessori School share's its space with John Hanson French Immersion School.

The Montessori program provides an interdisciplinary, discovery-based approach to learning. The program was founded by Maria Montessori, who was an Italian physician and anthropologist, created learning activities that interrelate and build upon each other, and are presented sequentially over the years a child spends in the program. The Montessori Middle School Program completes the Montessori studies for students progressing to the seventh and eighth grades. An interdisciplinary teaching team provides the Montessori Program for multidisciplinary learning to include English Language Arts, mathematics, science and social studies.

As of 2009, 82.9% of students in grades seven and eight were proficient in reading. 72.7% of students in grades seven and eight were proficient in mathematics. 23.1% of all students were eligible for the government-funded free and reduced lunch program.

== Hyattsville Middle School ==
Hyattsville Middle School for the Creative and Performing Arts

Location
- Hyattsville, Maryland; United States; 38.960130°N 76.945088°W

Information
- Website: www.pgcps.org/hyattsvillems/

Hyattsville Middle School (Area 1, District 2, grades 6–8, Weblink) is a public school, located in Hyattsville. The principal is Chanita Stamper. The school hours are 9:10 am to 3:55 pm. Approximately 705 students were enrolled as of September 2022. The school has uniforms with different color tops for each grade level (gold for 6th, royal blue for 7th, black for 8th).

Hyattsville Middle School is both a comprehensive school and a Creative and Performing Arts magnet program, which was introduced at the school in 2004. The program was modeled after the successful arts program at Thomas Pullen. However, unlike the program at Thomas Pullen — which is a K–8 whole-school program — the CPA program at Hyattsville has a limited attendance area available only to students in Regions 2 and 5 who must audition for the program. CPA operates as a "program within a school" with all students receiving instruction according to the general curriculum guidelines of Prince George's County Public Schools, and CPA students receiving additional specialized instruction in band, orchestra, vocal music, theatre, creative writing, media arts, dance, or visual arts.

As of 2019, 35.1% of all students were proficient in English language arts and 18.5% of students were proficient in mathematics. In 2021, 79.9% of students were eligible for the government-funded free and reduced lunch program.

Hyattsville Middle School mainly serves the communities of Hyattsville, North Brentwood, Brentwood, Mount Rainier, Cottage City, Colmar Manor, Bladensburg, Rogers Heights, Edmonston, University Park, as well as a small portion of Cheverly and College Park.

In August 2023, a new Hyattsville Middle School building opened. Work to replace the old building had begun in 2001 under a new public–private partnership (P3) capital improvement program. During the construction process, HMS students were relocated to the campuses of Thomas S. Stone Elementary School in Mount Rainier, Robert Goddard Montessori School in Seabrook, and (for school year 2021–22 while additional swing space was constructed in Seabrook) the former Meadowbrook Elementary School in Bowie.

Hyattsville Elementary School, Mount Rainier Elementary School, Thomas S. Stone Elementary School, Riverdale Elementary School, and University Park Elementary School are all feeder schools into Hyattsville Middle School. All non-magnet students at Hyattsville Middle School, living within the city of Hyattsville's boundaries or University Park, go on to attend Northwestern High School in Hyattsville, while the other non-magnet students living in North Brentwood, Brentwood, Mount Rainier, Cottage City, Colmar Manor, Edmonston, Rogers Heights, and Bladensburg, attend Bladensburg High School in Bladensburg. On the other hand, non-magnet students who attended Hyattsville Middle School who actually live in the very small portion of College Park served by Hyattsville Middle School, attend Eleanor Roosevelt High School in Greenbelt. CPA magnet students can audition to attend the Jim Henson Academy of Arts, Media and Communications at Northwestern High School or the Center for the Visual and Performing Arts at Suitland High School, depending upon home address.

== Andrew Jackson Academy ==
Andrew Jackson Academy

Location
- Suitland, Maryland; United States; 38.840974°N 76.908395°W

Information
- Website: www.pgcps.org/andrewjackson/

Andrew Jackson Academy (Area 3, District 3, grades PreK-8, Weblink) is a combined PreK-8th grade comprehensive school, located in Suitland. The school is named after Andrew Jackson, the seventh President of the United States (1829–1837).

The principal is Veonca Richardson. The school hours are from 8:30 am to 3:10 pm. Approximately 700 students were enrolled as of September 2009. There is a mandatory uniform policy in effect at this school.

Andrew Jackson was converted from a seventh and eighth grade middle school to a pre-kindergarten through eighth grade elementary and middle school, in the fall of 2009. Prior to that, Andrew Jackson was a magnet school, housing the now eliminated Humanities and International Studies program.

The Andrew Jackson Academy mainly serves the communities of District Heights, Bradbury Heights, Suitland, Silver Hill Forestville, and Morningside.

Andrew Jackson Academy, just like Drew Freeman Middle School, draws students from District Heights Elementary School, Suitland Elementary School, Bradbury Heights Elementary School, Edgar Allan Poe Elementary School, William Beanes Elementary School, Morningside Elementary School, and Forestville Elementary School. Both the Andrew Jackson Academy and Drew Freeman Middle School then feed into Suitland High School.

== Thomas Johnson Middle School ==
Thomas Johnson Middle School

Location
- Lanham, Maryland; United States; 38.960535°N 76.841281°W

Information
- Website: www.pgcps.org/thomasjohnson/

Thomas Johnson Middle School (Area 2, District 1, grades 6–8, Weblink) is a comprehensive, located in Lanham. The school is named after Thomas Johnson, who was the first elected Governor of Maryland, a delegate to the Continental Congress, and an Associate Justice of the United States Supreme Court. The principal is Rodney McBride. The school hours are 9:00 am to 3:40 pm. Thomas Johnson has roughly 904 students enrolled. The projected enrollment for 2011–12 is over 1000 students. There is a mandatory uniform policy in place at this school. The school is home to the 2010 county middle school basketball team, and an active music department (with 60 string orchestra students, over 100 band students and over 100 choral students). Just recently the county came back with middle school sports. Thomas Johnson Jaguars baseball team made it all the way to the 2013–14 championship, and were the runner-up team.

As of 2009, 66.3% and 42.8% of all students were proficient in reading and mathematics, respectively. 54.9% of all students were eligible for the government-funded free and reduced lunch program.

Thomas Johnson feeds into DuVal High School.

== Dr. Ernest Everett Just Middle School ==
Dr. Ernest Everett Just Middle School

Location
- Mitchellville, Maryland; United States; 38.907198°N 76.830107°W

Information
- Website: www.pgcps.org/ernesteverettjust/

Dr. Ernest Everett Just Middle School (Area 3, District 5, grades 6–8, Weblink) is a comprehensive middle school, located in Mitchellville. The school is named after Ernest Everett Just, who was a pioneering African American biologist, academic and science writer. The principal is Kelvin Moore. The school hours are from 9:00am to 3:40pm. There are about 964 students enrolled as of September 2009. There is currently a mandatory uniform policy at this school.

Just is a relatively new school, constructed a few years ago. The school is one of a few unique schools within the system to feature a full community/recreation center, attached to the facility. The school has a capacity of about 990 students.

As of 2009, 78.9% of all students were proficient in reading and 59.4% of all students were proficient in mathematics. 33.5% of all students were eligible for the government-funded free and reduced lunch program.

Most of Just's students attend high school at nearby Charles Herbert Flowers High School, while others attend Largo High School.

== Kenmoor Middle School ==
Kenmoor Middle School

Location
- Landover, Maryland; United States; 38.925313°N 76.867481°W

Information
- Website: www1.pgcps.org/kenmoorms/

Kenmoor Middle School (Area 2, District 3, grades 6–8, Weblink) is a magnet school located in Landover. The school features the Talented and Gifted (TAG) magnet program as well as the AVID Signature Program. Kenmoor was named a 1988–89 Maryland Blue Ribbon School and went on to become a 1988–89 National Blue Ribbon School of Excellence.

The principal is Rebecca Turner. The school hours are from 9:30 am to 4:20 pm. There are approximately 800 students enrolled as of September 2009. There is no uniform policy in effect at this school.

The TAG magnet program at Kenmoor functions as a "school-within-a-school." Most of the students take classes outside the magnet and are a part of the standard comprehensive program. The TAG magnet program provides a full-day of intensive educational program appropriate for identified talented and gifted students. Students are accepted into the program through Magnet Lottery application on a space-available basis.

In addition to the TAG program, Kenmoor Middle School is also well known for its Special Education program in which students residing in various neighborhoods of Prince George's County whose normally assigned middle schools do not have special education programs, end up being transferred to Kenmoor Middle School so that they can receive the Special Education services/ assistance with classroom learning activities that they require. Kenmoor Middle School is one of very few schools in Prince George's County to offer a structured Special Education program, in which students with learning abilities receive more individualized attention from licensed Special Education teachers/ are sent to a small classroom setting with other students with learning disabilities for a small amount of time each school day after most of their core/ academic classes, such as English/ Language Arts/ Reading, Social Studies, Science, and Math, and extra-curricular classes, such as Physical Education and Art, which they interact with students without learning disabilities, are over. During the time each of the special education students spend in this small group setting with each other along with their licensed Special Education teachers, they are given structured lessons/ activities regarding social skills, cognitive skills, study skills, and various methods/ strategies of how to interact with their peers, understand their peers, seek assistance from staff members/ adults/ teachers whenever they need any help, think critically, and learn healthy ways of expressing their emotions/ thoughts/ feelings. The Special Education teachers, then, are specifically trained/ responsible for working with Regular Classroom Teachers and Teachers' Assistants, to develop a specific Individualized Education Plan (IEP), or 504 plan, in which each of the students with learning disabilities are challenged enough/ are reaching their full learning potential in the classroom. The Special Education teachers then communicate with each of the special education students' regular classroom teachers regarding each of the special education students' learning disability/ the specific list of accommodations each of them need in order to be able to learn to the best of their ability in each of the classroom settings, set goals for each of the special need students that will help them learn to the best of their abilities, and making sure each of the special education students' Regular Classroom Teachers and Teachers Assistants' are monitoring/ keeping track of each special education students' progress and communicating with the licensed Special Education Teachers about it. The Special Education teachers then host Individualized Education Program (IEP), or 504 plan meetings with each of the special education students' parents or guardians regarding how well they are being challenged and reaching their goals, as well as some advice on certain behaviors each of the special education students should either try to engage more in, or refrain from doing, in order to fully reach their learning potential in the classroom setting/ school environment and seamlessly interact with their other non-learning disabled peers.

As of 2009, 69% and 58.2% of all students were proficient in reading and mathematics, respectively. 61.7% of all students were eligible to participate in the government-funded free and reduced lunch program.

Kenmoor Middle School mainly serves the communities of Landover, Landover Hills, and Glenarden, as well as most of Cheverly and Tuxedo. Feeder schools to Kenmoor Middle School are Kenmoor Elementary School, Glenarden Woods Elementary School, Judge Sylvania W. Woods Elementary School, Gladys Noon Spellman Elementary School, Cheverly Tuxedo Elementary School, Glenridge Elementary School, Woodridge Elementary School, Cooper Lane Elementary School, Dodge Park Elementary School, Palmer Park Elementary School, and Columbia Park Elementary School. Kenmoor Middle School then serves as one of two feeder middle schools along with nearby G. James Gholson Middle School, into Fairmount Heights High School.

== Dora Kennedy French Immersion School ==
Dora Kennedy French Immersion School

Location
- Greenbelt, Maryland; United States; 38.987743°N 76.842048°W

Information
- Website: www.pgcps.org/dorakennedy/

Dora Kennedy French Immersion (Area 2, District 1, grades K-8, Weblink) is a dedicated K-8 magnet school located in the city of Greenbelt. The facility is named after Dora F. Kennedy, the first supervisor of foreign-language education for PGCPS. The principal is James Spence. The school hours are 9:15 am to 3:45 pm. There are approximately 594 students enrolled at the school. There is no uniform policy currently in effect.

Dora Kennedy French Immersion is a relatively new school with an old background. The school was renamed after Kennedy in 2015, shortly after relocating. Previously, it was co-located with Robert Goddard Montessori at the old Goddard 7th and 8th grade comprehensive middle school facility. Between 2005 and 2008, the PGCPS Magnet Schools Program underwent a massive overhaul. As part of the overhaul, the French Immersion Magnet Programs at Rogers Heights Elementary School in Bladensburg and Greenbelt Middle School in Greenbelt, were relocated and consolidated into one centralized location at the under-enrolled Robert Goddard facility in Seabrook. In 2014, the Robert Goddard French Immersion programs was relocated to the old Greenbelt Middle School. It was also made a Maryland and National Blue Ribbon School in 2014.

As part of the French Immersion magnet program, students are taught all subjects in French language. The teachers are native French speakers from around the world. Students also study Russian. Algebra and geometry are possible options in mathematics. The interdisciplinary approach for English, art, and world studies includes special themes, seminars, field trips, and a strong focus on essay writing. International travel is an enrichment part of the French Immersion Program.

As of 2009, 90.7% of French Immersion students were reading proficient and 87.8% of French Immersion students were proficient in mathematics. 24.3% of students were eligible for the government-run free and reduced lunch program.

French Immersion students can continue their studies at the high school level, at Central High School in Capitol Heights.

== Kettering Middle School ==
Kettering Middle School

Location
- Kettering; United States; 38.894970°N 76.811036°W

Information
- Website: www.pgcps.org/ketteringms/

Kettering Middle School (Area 3, District 5, grades 6–8, Weblink) is a comprehensive middle school located in Kettering. Kettering is a former magnet school, having housed the Communication and Academic Studies magnet program for a number of years before the program was phased out by the school system, in 2005.

The principal at Kettering is Denise Dunn. The school hours are from 7:45 am until 2:25 pm. There are approximately 712 students enrolled at the school. There is a mandatory uniform policy in place at Kettering.

As of 2009, 69.1% of all students were proficient in reading and 50.7% of all students were proficient in mathematics. 40.2% of all students were eligible for the government-funded free and reduced lunch program.

Most of Kettering's students attend high school at Largo High School and others attend Dr. Henry A. Wise Jr. High School.

== Martin Luther King Jr. Middle School ==
Martin Luther King Jr. Middle School

Location
- Beltsville, Maryland; United States; 39.054939°N 76.909404°W

Information
- Type: Middle School
- Opened: 9:25
- Closed: 4:10
- School district: PGCPS
- Principal: Ms. Prince
- Grades: 6-8
- Website: www.pgcps.org/martinlutherkingjr/

Martin Luther King Jr. Middle School (Area 1, District 1, grades 6–8, Weblink) is a comprehensive middle school, located in Beltsville. The school is named after the Reverend Dr. Martin Luther King Jr., an American clergyman, activist and prominent leader in the civil rights movement. The principal is Robynne Prince. The school hours are from 9:25am until 4:10pm. The student enrollment is approximately 660.

Martin Luther King Junior High School opened to students in the 1970s. In the mid-1980s, the school was converted into a dedicated Academic Center magnet school. The program was a whole-school magnet and highly competitive. The school's name was subsequently changed to Martin Luther King Jr. Academic Center. It began to flourish and eventually became the highest performing middle school in the county. In 1993, the school was named a Maryland Blue Ribbon School and was designated a National Blue Ribbon School of Excellence. The school prospered throughout the 1990s and into the start of the 21st century. Despite all of the school's accolades and academic achievements, when the PGCPS Board of Education voted to revamp the system's magnet programs, it was decided that all Academic Centers would be eliminated, as most were under-performing with the exception of the programs at Beltsville Academic Center and MLK. There was a lot of opposition against the decision, but the program was still eliminated at the end of the 2006 school year. The school is now simply called Martin Luther King Jr. Middle School.

MLK now has the AVID Signature Program. AVID is an educational program for middle and high school students that supports them in achieving their college goals through an academic elective course that teaches specific skills and reinforces the academic core. As part of the AVID program, students must also enroll in challenging or honors courses offered at their school. AVID students are middle and high school students who currently earn Bs, Cs, and possibly even Ds. These students are interested in going to college and need additional support to realize this dream. AVID students are generally members of under-represented ethnic groups at the nation's colleges and universities, the first in their families to attend college, or face financial or other hardships that may interfere with attending college.

MLK also has an expansive arts program. There choirs are notable and consistently score high ratings at festivals locally and nationally. The choirs are the main Mixed Chorus, the Girls Choir, the selective all-eighth-grade King Singers, and the combined Mass Choir.

Martin Luther King Jr. Middle School primarily serves the communities of Beltsville, Calverton (the Prince George's County Side Only), and Vansville, as well as a small portion of College Park.

Calverton Elementary School, Vansville Elementary School, and Hollywood Elementary School all serve as feeder schools into Martin Luther King Jr. Middle School. Martin Luther King Jr. Middle School then serves as a feeder school into High Point High School and Laurel High School as well.

== James Madison Middle School ==
James Madison Middle School

Location
- Rosaryville, Maryland; United States; 38.788525°N 76.840208°W

Information
- Website: www.pgcps.org/jamesmadison/

James Madison Middle School (Area 3, District 5, grades 6–8, Weblink) is a comprehensive middle school, located in Rosaryville. The school is named after the fourth President of the United States, James Madison, who is considered one of the Founding Fathers of the United States. The principal is Beverly Botchway. The approximate student enrollment is 972. There is a mandatory uniform policy at this school.

As of 2009, 77.4% of all students were proficient in reading and 47.2% of all students were proficient in mathematics. 29.5% of all students were eligible to participate in the government-funded free and reduced lunch program.

Most of Madison's students attend high school at Dr. Henry A. Wise Jr. High School, while a portion attend Frederick Douglass High School.

== Thurgood G. Marshall Middle School ==
38.801679°N 76.922010°W

Thurgood G. Marshall Middle School (Area 4, District 4, grades 6–8, Weblink) is a comprehensive middle school located in Camp Springs. The school was originally named after Supreme Court Justice and Maryland native Roger B. Taney. It was later renamed after Thurgood Marshall, the first African American to serve on the Supreme Court of the United States.

The principal is Dr.DeMarco Clark. The school hours are from 9:00 am until 3:40 pm. The enrollment at the school is approximately 841. There is a mandatory uniform policy in effect at this school.

As of 2009, 65.5% of all students tested proficient in reading while 33.5% of all students test proficient in mathematics. 50.1% of all students were eligible to participate in the government-funded free and reduced lunch program.

Middleton Valley Elementary School and Allentown Elementary School are the primary schools that feed into Thurgood Marshall Middle School. Thurgood Marshall Middle School primarily feeds into Crossland High School, with a portion of students feeding into Potomac High School, Dr. Henry A. Wise Jr. High School, Surrattsville High School, and Oxon Hill High School.

== Samuel P. Massie Academy ==
38.844609°N 76.907092°W

Samuel P. Massie Academy (Area 3, Region 3, grades PreK–8, Weblink) is a comprehensive combined elementary and middle school, located in Forestville. The school is named after Samuel Massie, who was elected as the third President of North Carolina College at Durham. Dr. Massie came to the institution from Washington, D. C., where he was Associate Program Director for Undergraduate Science Education of the National Science Foundation and Professor and Chairman of the Department of Pharmaceutical Chemistry at Howard University. He resigned on February 1, 1966, and served as a chemistry professor at the United States Naval Academy from 1966 to 1993.

The school was opened in 2004 as Samuel P. Massie Elementary School. The school was converted to a pre-kindergarten through eighth grade configuration, in the fall of 2009. The current principal is Michelle H. Pegram. The school has a capacity of 790 students. The approximate student enrollment is 552. The school hours are 7:45 am until 2:25 pm. There is a mandatory uniform policy in place at Massie.

Samuel Massie students feed into Suitland High School.

== Samuel Ogle Middle School ==
38.993526°N 76.741632°W

Samuel Ogle Middle School (Area 2, District 5, grades 6–8, Weblink) is a comprehensive middle school, located in Bowie. The school was named for Samuel Ogle, who was the Provincial Governor of Maryland from 1731 to 1732, 1733 to 1742, and 1746/1747 to 1752.

The principal of the school is Cameron Millspaugh. The approximate student enrollment is 1,035 students. The school hours are from 9:30 am until 4:10 pm. There is currently no uniform policy at this school.

Samuel Ogle was originally opened as a junior high school. The school was eventually converted to an elementary school where it remained so until 2007, when the school underwent yet another conversion, back to a middle school. The school was intended to alleviate overcrowding at Bowie's main intermediate school, Benjamin Tasker, which at the time was the largest middle school in the system in terms of student enrollment, and which had an enrollment higher than many of the area high schools.

As of 2009, 83.9% of all students were proficient in reading, while 74.2% of all students were proficient in mathematics, as identified through statement mandated testing. 24.1% of all students were eligible to participate in the government-funded free and reduced lunch program.

Samuel Ogle Middle School has a whole-school AVID Signature Program.

In sports, Samuel Ogle Middle School's mascot is a Ram. Ogle's main rival is Benjamin Tasker Middle School, also in Bowie. For the '09–10 and '10–11 school years, Samuel Ogle Middle School's Boys Baseball team has won the County Championship. This was also the last year for middle school sports in the county, as PGCPS system leaders had to make budget cuts. In 2013 and in 2019, Samuel Ogle Baseball won the County Championship.

Students from Samuel Ogle attend high school at Bowie High School.

== Nicholas Orem Middle School ==
38.964389°N 76.960419°W

Nicholas Orem Middle School (Area 1, District 2, grades 6–8, Weblink) is a Title I comprehensive middle school, located in Hyattsville. The school is named in honor of former Prince George's County Public Schools' superintendent, Nicholas Orem.

The acting principal is Theresa Merrifield. The approximate student enrollment is 692. The school hours are from 9:30 am until 4:10 pm. The school has a mandatory uniform policy in place.

Nicholas Orem was originally opened as a junior high school with grades seven through nine. The school was converted to a seventh and eighth grade middle school, in the early 1980s. Nicholas Orem was also a former Science, Mathematics, and Technology magnet school, from the late-1980s until 2004. The school was then divided into four academic teams: Team 1 (7th grade magnet), Team 2 (8th grade magnet), Team 3 (7th & 8th grade comprehensive), and Team 4 (Creative Arts). After the magnet was eliminated, the school became a comprehensive school. In 2007, a sixth grade (from Lewisdale Elementary School) was added to Nicholas Orem, making it a true middle school configuration with grades six, seven, and eight.

As of 2009, 63.2% and 45.3% of all students were proficient in reading and mathematics, respectively.

Chillum Elementary School, Ridgecrest Elementary School, Cesar Chavez Elementary School, Rosa L. Parks Elementary School, Lewisdale Elementary School, Carole Highlands Elementary School, and the very recently opened Edward M. Felegy Elementary School, are all feeder schools into Nicholas Orem Middle School. Nicholas Orem Middle School then feeds into Northwestern High School.

== Oxon Hill Middle School ==
38.761642°N 77.014085°W

Oxon Hill Middle School (Area 4, District 4, grades 6–8, Weblink) is a comprehensive middle school, located in Fort Washington. The principal is Tiwana Cook. The student enrollment is approximately 650 students. The school hours are from 9:00am until 3:40pm. There is a mandatory uniform policy in effect at this school.

Oxon Hill Middle School was a former Montessori magnet school. The program was relocated to John Hanson in 2005. Oxon Hill now has a whole-school AVID Signature Program.

As of 2009, 68.1% of all students were proficient in reading and 44.5% of all students were proficient in mathematics. 51.3% of all students were eligible to participate in the government-funded free and reduced lunch program.

The majority of Oxon Hill Middle School's students go on to attend Oxon Hill High School, with a portion of students feeding into Potomac High School.

== Colin Powell Academy ==
It formed in 2023 with the merger of Isaac J. Gourdine Middle School and Potomac Landing Elementary School.

== Thomas G. Pullen Creative and Performing Arts Magnet School ==
38.900247°N 76.854547°W

The Thomas G. Pullen School for the Creative and Performing Arts (Area 2, District 3, grades K–8, Weblink) is a dedicated magnet school, located in Landover. The principal is Pamela Lucas. The approximate school enrollment is 661 students. The school hours are from 9:00 am until 3:40 pm. There is no uniform policy in effect at this school.

The Thomas G. Pullen School was the original magnet school for the Creative and Performing Arts, in Prince George's County. The program has, thus far, proved to be very successful. During the magnet program overhaul in 2004, it was decided that, not only would the creative and performing arts program be retained, but it would also be expanded to other schools.

The arts magnet schools follow the general curriculum guidelines that are used for all Prince George's County public elementary and middle schools. Basic instruction is provided in reading, mathematics, English, science, and social studies, as well as specialized instruction in the arts – art, drama, music, dance, physical education, creative writing, media production, literary arts, and related computer lab experiences.

As of 2009, 89% of all students tested proficient in reading while 80.4% of students tested proficient in mathematics. 27.4% of all students were eligible to participate in the government-funded free and reduced lunch program.

Thomas Pullen students have the option of continuing their specialized arts magnet education, in the Center for the Visual and Performing Arts magnet program at Suitland High School.

== Benjamin Stoddert Middle School ==
38.830251°N 76.947663°W

Benjamin Stoddert Middle School (Area 4, District 4, grades 6–8, Weblink) is a comprehensive middle school, located in Marlow Heights. The school is named after Benjamin Stoddert, the first United States Secretary of the Navy, from May 1, 1798, to March 31, 1801.

The principal is Hillary Garner. The approximate student enrollment is 720. The school hours are from 8:30 am until 3:10 pm. This school has a mandatory uniform policy in effect.

As of 2009, 60.6% of students tested proficient in reading, while 30% of students tested proficient in mathematics. 57.7% of all students were eligible to participate in the federally funded free and reduced-price lunch program.

Benjamin Stoddert Middle School primarily serves the communities of Marlow Heights, Hillcrest Heights, and Temple Hills, as well as a small portion of Silver Hill.

Hillcrest Heights Elementary School and Samuel Chase Elementary School (formerly, "Temple Hills Elementary School"), are the only two schools that serve as feeder schools for Benjamin Stoddert Middle School. Benjamin Stoddert Middle School then feeds into Crossland High School.

== Benjamin Tasker Middle School ==
38.958091°N 76.745483°W

Benjamin Tasker Middle School (Area 3, Region 5, grades 6–8, Weblink) is a comprehensive middle school, located in Bowie. The school is named for the Provincial Governor of Maryland, Benjamin Tasker, Sr., who served from 1752 to 1753. The current principal is Ingrid Johnson. The approximate student enrollment is 931. The school hours are 8:30 until 3:10 pm.

As of 2009, 61.5% of all students tested proficient in reading and 45.1% of all students tested proficient in mathematics.

Benjamin Tasker students feed into Bowie High School.

Benjamin Tasker Middle School is notable as one of the shooting sites in the Beltway sniper attacks. Eighth-grader Iran Brown was shot and critically wounded outside of the school on the morning of October 7, 2002. Brown survived the attack and ultimately testified at shooter John Allan Muhammad's trial.

== Walker Mill Middle School ==
38.876969°N 76.885645°W

Walker Mill Middle School (Area 3, Region 3, grades 6–8, Weblink) is a magnet school located in Walker Mill. The principal is Dr. Nicole Clifton. The approximate student enrollment is 707. The school hours are from 9:30 am until 4:10 pm. Walker Mill is one of two Talented and Gifted Center magnet middle schools in Prince George's County. The TAG magnet at Walker Mill functions as a "school-within-a-school." Most of the students take classes outside the magnet and are a part of the standard comprehensive program. The TAG magnet program provides a full-day of intensive educational program appropriate for identified talented and gifted students. Students are accepted into the program through Magnet Lottery application on a space-available basis.

As of 2009, 79.7% of all students tested proficient in reading and 63.5% of all students tested proficient in mathematics.

Walker Mill Middle School serves the communities of Walker Mill, Seat Pleasant, Capitol Heights, and Coral Hills.

Seat Pleasant Elementary School, Capitol Heights Elementary School, and Doswell E. Brooks Elementary School are the only three schools that feed into Walker Mill Middle School. Walker Mill Middle School then feeds into Central High School.

== William Wirt Middle School ==
38.967025°N 76.909956°W

William Wirt Middle School (Area 2, District 2, grades 6–8, Weblink) is a Title I comprehensive middle school, located in Riverdale. The school is named after William Wirt, who was an American author and statesman, and who is credited with turning the position of United States Attorney General into one of influence.

The principal is Rhonda Simley. The approximate enrollment is 781 students. The school hours are from 9:00 am until 3:40 pm. There is a mandatory uniform policy at this school.

In 2009, 62.9% of all students test proficient in reading, and 56.9% of all students tested proficient in mathematics. 83.2% of all students were eligible to participate in the federally funded free and reduced-price lunch program.

Riverdale Elementary School, Carters Lane Elementary School, and Beacon Heights Elementary School are the only three schools that feed into William Wirt Middle School. William Wirt Middle School then feeds into Parkdale High School.

== Former schools ==
=== Isaac J. Gourdine Middle School ===
Isaac J. Gourdine Middle School

Location
- Fort Washington, Maryland; United States; 38.769669°N 76.951316°W

Information
- Website: www1.pgcps.org/isaacgourdine/

Isaac J. Gourdine Middle School (Area 4, District 4, grades 6–8, Weblink) was a comprehensive middle school located in Fort Washington. The school was originally named Lord Baltimore Middle School, and later, Lord Baltimore Academy (reflecting the school's Traditional/Classical Academy magnet program). The school was renamed in 2004 after Councilman Isaac J. Gourdine, who was serving his second term on the Prince George's County Council when he died in a tragic automobile accident on February 25, 2002. He served on the Prince George's County Council from 1994 through February 2002.

School hours are between 7:50 am and 2:50 pm. There was a mandatory uniform policy in place at this school. The September 2009 enrollment was 659 students in grades six through eight.

Isaac J. Gourdine Middle School used to house a Traditional/Classical Academy magnet program, until it was eliminated system-wide in 2005. The school was a comprehensive middle school with an Autism Program and a whole-school AVID Signature Program.

As of 2009, 67.8% and 43.7% of all students were proficient in reading and mathematics, respectively. 47.6% of all students were eligible for the government-funded free and reduced lunch program.

Isaac Gourdine Middle School fed into Friendly High School.

In 2023 it merged into Colin Powell Academy.
