= Ascension Lutheran School =

Ascension Lutheran School may refer to:

- Ascension Lutheran School, Thousand Oaks, a Lutheran school in the United States
- Ascension Lutheran School, Torrance, California
- Ascension Lutheran School (Prince George's County, Maryland), a school in Prince George's County, Maryland
