= Summerfield, Maryland =

- Census-designated place
- Location in Maryland Summerfield (the United States)
- Coordinates: 38°54′N 76°52′W
- Country: United States
- State: Maryland
- County: Prince George's

Area
  - Total: 3.65 sq mi (9.46 km^{2})
  - Land: 3.64 sq mi (9.43 km^{2})
  - Water: 0.012 sq mi (0.03 km^{2})
- Elevation: 240 ft (73 m)

Population (2020)
  - Total: 14,758
  - Density: 4,054.3/sq mi (1,565.38/km^{2})
- Time zone: UTC−5 (Eastern (EST))
  - Summer (DST): UTC−4 (EDT)
- Area codes: 301, 240
- FIPS code: 24-75810

Summerfield is a census-designated place in Prince George's County, Maryland. As of the 2020 census, the population was 14,758. A suburb of Washington, D.C., the area is home to Northwest Stadium and the Prince George's County Sports and Learning Complex. It first became a census-designated place after the 2010 census.

== Geography ==
According to the U.S. Census Bureau, Summerfield has a total area of 3.6 square miles (9.4 km^{2}), of which 0.012 square miles (0.03 km^{2}), or 0.03%, is water. The CDP is bordered to the east by the Capital Beltway (I-495/95) and to the south by Maryland Route 214 (Central Avenue). The CDP of Landover borders Summerfield to the north, the city of Glenarden is to the northeast, Lake Arbor is to the east, Largo is to the southeast, Walker Mill is to the southwest, and Peppermill Village and Seat Pleasant border Summerfield to the west.

== Demographics ==
Historical population
Census	Pop.	Note	%±
2010	10,898		—
2020	14,758		35.4%
U.S. Decennial Census; 2010 2020

Summerfield first appeared as a census designated place in the 2010 U.S. census.

=== Racial and ethnic composition ===
Summerfield CDP, Maryland – Racial and ethnic composition Note: the US Census treats Hispanic/Latino as an ethnic category. This table excludes Latinos from the racial categories and assigns them to a separate category. Hispanics/Latinos may be of any race.
Race / Ethnicity (NH = Non-Hispanic)	Pop 2010	Pop 2020	% 2010	% 2020
White alone (NH)	178	264	1.63%	1.79%
Black or African American alone (NH)	9,861	12,757	90.48%	86.44%
Native American or Alaska Native alone (NH)	21	36	0.19%	0.24%
Asian alone (NH)	141	143	1.29%	0.97%
Native Hawaiian or Pacific Islander alone (NH)	3	1	0.03%	0.01%
Other race alone (NH)	15	83	0.14%	0.56%
Mixed race or Multiracial (NH)	186	423	1.71%	2.87%
Hispanic or Latino (any race)	493	1,051	4.52%	7.12%
Total	10,898	14,758	100.00%	100.00%

=== 2020 census ===
As of the 2020 census, Summerfield had a population of 14,758. The median age was 35.7 years. 22.1% of residents were under the age of 18 and 11.8% of residents were 65 years of age or older. For every 100 females there were 80.9 males, and for every 100 females age 18 and over there were 75.3 males age 18 and over.

100.0% of residents lived in urban areas, while 0.0% lived in rural areas.

There were 5,800 households in Summerfield, of which 31.2% had children under the age of 18 living in them. Of all households, 26.3% were married-couple households, 19.8% were households with a male householder and no spouse or partner present, and 47.5% were households with a female householder and no spouse or partner present. About 31.3% of all households were made up of individuals and 8.2% had someone living alone who was 65 years of age or older.

There were 6,143 housing units, of which 5.6% were vacant. The homeowner vacancy rate was 0.8% and the rental vacancy rate was 6.9%.

== Education ==
Summerfield's public schools are managed by Prince George's County Public Schools.

Zoned elementary schools include Highland Park, William Paca, and Cora L. Rice. Zoned middle schools include G. James Gholson and Kenmoor. Zoned high schools include Central High School, Fairmont Heights High School, and Charles Herbert Flowers High School.

John Carroll Elementary School was previously located in what is now Summerfield CDP. It was scheduled to close in 2009.

== Transportation ==
Washington Metro operates the Morgan Boulevard station in Summerfield CDP.

== Raljon ==
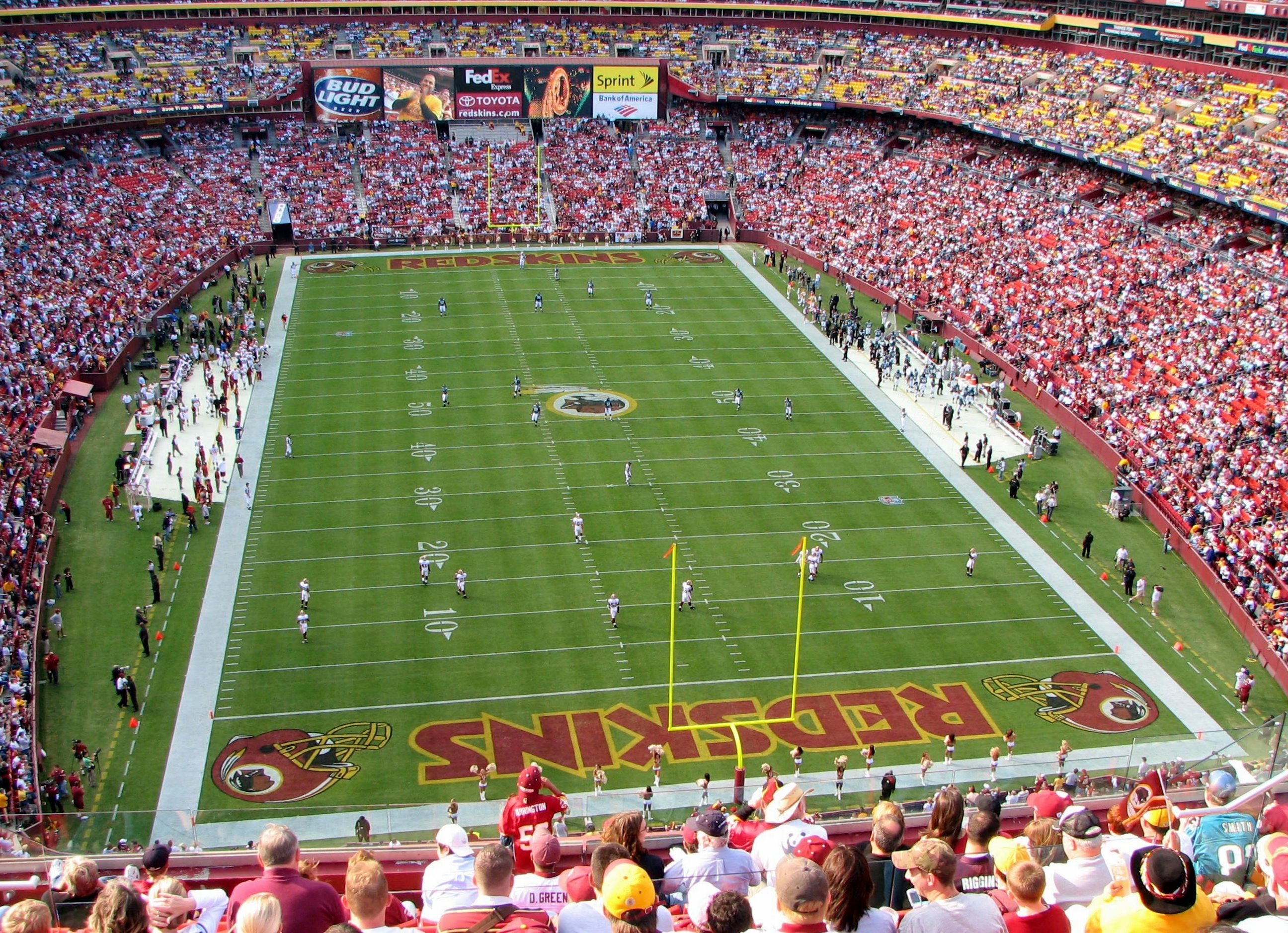
FedExField in Raljon

Raljon was the original place name of the campus of Northwest Stadium, home of the Washington Commanders. Former team owner Jack Kent Cooke (whose full name originally graced the stadium) derived the name from the names of his sons, Ralph (1937–1995) and John. Introduced in 1997, the name enjoyed almost no currency beyond the team (then known as the Redskins), NFL press releases, television and radio partners, and the U.S. Postal Service, which granted Cooke's request that the area be officially recognized, which applied specifically to the stadium campus's extended 20785-4534 ZIP+4 Code. Tony Kornheiser, in a column criticizing the name, wrote, "Lucky for us, Cooke didn't name his kids Peter and Ennis." Daniel Snyder phased out the requirement to dateline of stadium events originating in Raljon before the 1999 preseason, and quietly phased out the placename soon after his purchase of the team.
