= Seat Pleasant, Maryland =

- City
- Flag Seal

- Location of Seat Pleasant, Maryland
- Coordinates: 38°53′43″N 76°54′8″W
- Country: United States of America
- State: Maryland
- County: Prince George's
- Incorporated: 1931

Government
  - Type: Nonpartisan
  - Mayor: Kelly Porter

Area
  - Total: 0.74 sq mi (1.92 km^{2})
  - Land: 0.74 sq mi (1.92 km^{2})
  - Water: 0 sq mi (0.00 km^{2})
- Elevation: 108 ft (33 m)

Population (2020)
  - Total: 4,522
  - Density: 6,093.2/sq mi (2,352.59/km^{2})
- Time zone: UTC-5 (Eastern (EST))
  - Summer (DST): UTC-4 (EDT)
- ZIP code: 20743
- Area codes: 301, 240
- FIPS code: 24-70850
- GNIS feature ID: 0598069
- Website: City of Seat Pleasant official website

Seat Pleasant is an incorporated city in Prince George's County, Maryland, United States, located immediately east of Washington, D.C.. Per the 2020 census, the population was 4,522. Two state highways pass through the community — Maryland routes 704 (now called Martin Luther King Jr. Highway and previously named George Palmer Highway in honor of banker and community leader George Palmer) and 214 (Central Avenue). The Washington Metro's Blue and Silver Lines are nearby. The Washington Commanders' stadium is east of Seat Pleasant, near the Capital Beltway (I-95/495).

== History ==
Seat Pleasant is located on part of what had been the Williams-Berry estate. In 1850, the descendants of General Otho Holland Williams, a Revolutionary War hero, and James Berry, a mid-17th-century Puritan leader, sold it to Joseph Gregory. Seat Pleasant was developed on the dairy farm of Joseph Gregory, the farm of the Hill family, and the land of building contractor Francis Carmody, among others. In 1873, some of the land along Addison Road was subdivided into small farms and rural home sites known as Jackson's Subdivision.

Designers of the Chesapeake Beach Railway, constructed in 1897–99 between Washington, D.C. and Chesapeake Beach, Maryland, located their first station in Maryland outside Washington on the railway's right-of-way that traversed the Gregory property. They called the station "District Line". The Columbia Railway Company operated a streetcar system that extended through Northeast Washington and terminated in Seat Pleasant at Eastern Avenue, near what is today Martin Luther King Jr. Highway. Finally, the Washington, Baltimore and Annapolis Electric Railway passed through Seat Pleasant in 1908. In 1906, the growing number of residents in the area around the station adopted a more imaginative name for their community — Seat Pleasant, after the early Williams-Berry estate. Prior to that, the area was known as Chesapeake Junction.

Steady growth of traffic on the railway between 1900 and its peak in 1920 translated into steady development for Seat Pleasant as a railroad suburb. Subdivisions were soon created, such as Seat Pleasant, Seat Pleasant Heights, Oakmont, Palmer's, Boyer's Addition, and Pleasant Hills. By 1915, two churches had been organized, and a fire department had been founded. The introduction of street lighting followed in 1918. When the community was incorporated as a town in 1931, it had a school, water company, sewer connections courtesy of the District of Columbia's sanitary system, and reliable fire protection by the Seat Pleasant Fire and Community Welfare Association. The Chesapeake Beach Railway ceased operations in 1935. In the 1980s, the old railroad roundhouse and turntable were demolished to make room for the Addison Plaza Shopping Center on Central Avenue.

Post-World War II state highway construction spurred further development. Construction of "affordable" housing, notably the Gregory Estates apartments in 1949, was the catalyst for the migration of African-American families from the District of Columbia; before that time, the community had been all white. The right of way of the former Washington, Baltimore and Annapolis Electric Railway was utilized in the early 1940s for the George Palmer Highway, later renamed the Martin Luther King Jr. Highway. The Addison Road Metro station opened for service on November 22, 1980.

Most of the testaments to the town's past are long gone. Two that remain are the Episcopal Addison Chapel (1809) and Mount Victory Baptist Church (1908).

Seat Pleasant's crime rate is higher than the national average. The violent crime rate, while still above average, has improved in recent years, dropping from 768.6 in 2003 to 272.2 in 2011.

== Politics ==
The current mayor is Kelly Porter.

City Council
Position	Name	Serving Since	Term Expires	District
President	Vacant	-	-	-
Member	Lamar Maxwell	2016	2020	Ward 1
Member	Hope Love	2010	2020	Ward 2
Member	Reversal L. Yeargin	1996	2020	Ward 3
Member	Charl M. Jones	1998	2020	Ward 4
Member	Donovan Bilbro	2016	2024	Ward 5
Member	Shireka McCarthy	2016	2024	At Large
Member	James Wright	2022	2024	At Large

== Schools ==
The city is served by the Prince George's County Public Schools district.

Zoned elementary schools include Seat Pleasant, Carmody Hills, and Highland Park elementary schools. All residents are zoned to G. James Gholson Middle School. High schools serving sections of the city are Fairmont Heights High School and Central High School.

== Geography ==
Seat Pleasant is located at 38°53′43″N 76°54′8″W (38.895362, -76.902205).

According to the United States Census Bureau, the city has a total area of 0.73 square miles (1.89 km^{2}), all land.

== Demographics ==
Historical population
Census	Pop.	Note	%±
1940	1,553		—
1950	2,255		45.2%
1960	5,365		137.9%
1970	7,217		34.5%
1980	5,217		−27.7%
1990	5,359		2.7%
2000	4,885		−8.8%
2010	4,542		−7.0%
2020	4,522		−0.4%
U.S. Decennial Census; 2010 2020

=== Racial and ethnic composition ===
Seat Pleasant city, Maryland – Racial and ethnic composition Note: the US Census treats Hispanic/Latino as an ethnic category. This table excludes Latinos from the racial categories and assigns them to a separate category. Hispanics/Latinos may be of any race.
Race / Ethnicity (NH = Non-Hispanic)	Pop 2000	Pop 2010	Pop 2020	% 2000	% 2010	% 2020
White alone (NH)	91	52	77	1.86%	1.14%	1.70%
Black or African American alone (NH)	4,708	4,118	3,502	96.38%	90.66%	77.44%
Native American or Alaska Native alone (NH)	5	12	6	0.10%	0.26%	0.13%
Asian alone (NH)	8	17	38	0.16%	0.37%	0.84%
Native Hawaiian or Pacific Islander alone (NH)	0	0	0	0.00%	0.00%	0.00%
Other race alone (NH)	4	11	21	0.08%	0.24%	0.46%
Mixed race or Multiracial (NH)	37	75	126	0.76%	1.65%	2.79%
Hispanic or Latino (any race)	32	257	752	0.66%	5.66%	16.63%
Total	4,885	4,542	4,522	100.00%	100.00%	100.00%

=== 2020 census ===
As of the 2020 census, Seat Pleasant had a population of 4,522. The median age was 37.7 years. 22.6% of residents were under the age of 18 and 15.8% of residents were 65 years of age or older. For every 100 females there were 83.7 males, and for every 100 females age 18 and over there were 81.6 males age 18 and over.

100.0% of residents lived in urban areas, while 0.0% lived in rural areas.

There were 1,700 households in Seat Pleasant, of which 35.6% had children under the age of 18 living in them. Of all households, 25.1% were married-couple households, 21.9% were households with a male householder and no spouse or partner present, and 48.3% were households with a female householder and no spouse or partner present. About 28.9% of all households were made up of individuals and 10.7% had someone living alone who was 65 years of age or older.

There were 1,802 housing units, of which 5.7% were vacant. The homeowner vacancy rate was 2.0% and the rental vacancy rate was 4.3%.

=== 2010 census ===
As of the census of 2010, there were 4,542 people, 1,650 households, and 1,135 families residing in the city. The population density was 6,221.9 inhabitants per square mile (2,402.3/km^{2}). There were 1,806 housing units at an average density of 2,474.0 per square mile (955.2/km^{2}). The racial makeup of the city was 2.0% White, 91.0% African American, 0.4% Native American, 0.4% Asian, 3.8% from other races, and 2.4% from two or more races. Hispanic or Latino of any race were 5.7% of the population.

There were 1,650 households, of which 37.7% had children under the age of 18 living with them, 26.2% were married couples living together, 35.3% had a female householder with no husband present, 7.3% had a male householder with no wife present, and 31.2% were non-families. 27.2% of all households were made up of individuals, and 10.5% had someone living alone who was 65 years of age or older. The average household size was 2.75 and the average family size was 3.32.

The median age in the city was 36.7 years. 25.9% of residents were under the age of 18; 9.7% were between the ages of 18 and 24; 24.6% were from 25 to 44; 25.7% were from 45 to 64; and 14.2% were 65 years of age or older. The gender makeup of the city was 45.1% male and 54.9% female.

=== 2000 census ===
As of the census of 2000, there were 4,885 people, 1,697 households, and 1,243 families residing in the city. The population density was 6,524.1 inhabitants per square mile (2,519.0/km^{2}). There were 1,806 housing units at an average density of 2,412.0 per square mile (931.3/km^{2}). The racial makeup of the city was 2.01% White, 96.72% African American, 0.10% Native American, 0.16% Asian, 0.14% from other races, and 0.86% from two or more races. Hispanic or Latino of any race were 0.66% of the population.

There were 1,697 households, out of which 32.2% had children under the age of 18 living with them, 32.1% were married couples living together, 34.6% had a female householder with no husband present, and 26.7% were non-families. 22.2% of all households were made up of individuals, and 7.5% had someone living alone who was 65 years of age or older. The average household size was 2.86 and the average family size was 3.33.

In the city, the population was spread out, with 30.1% under the age of 18, 8.0% from 18 to 24, 27.3% from 25 to 44, 21.9% from 45 to 64, and 12.7% who were 65 years of age or older. The median age was 35 years. For every 100 females, there were 81.5 males. For every 100 females age 18 and over, there were 77.3 males.

The median income for a household in the city was $42,476, and the median income for a family was $45,332. Males had a median income of $30,704 versus $30,909 for females. The per capita income for the city was $17,802. About 15.8% of families and 19.6% of the population were below the poverty line, including 31.4% of those under age 18 and 11.1% of those age 65 or over.

== Transportation ==
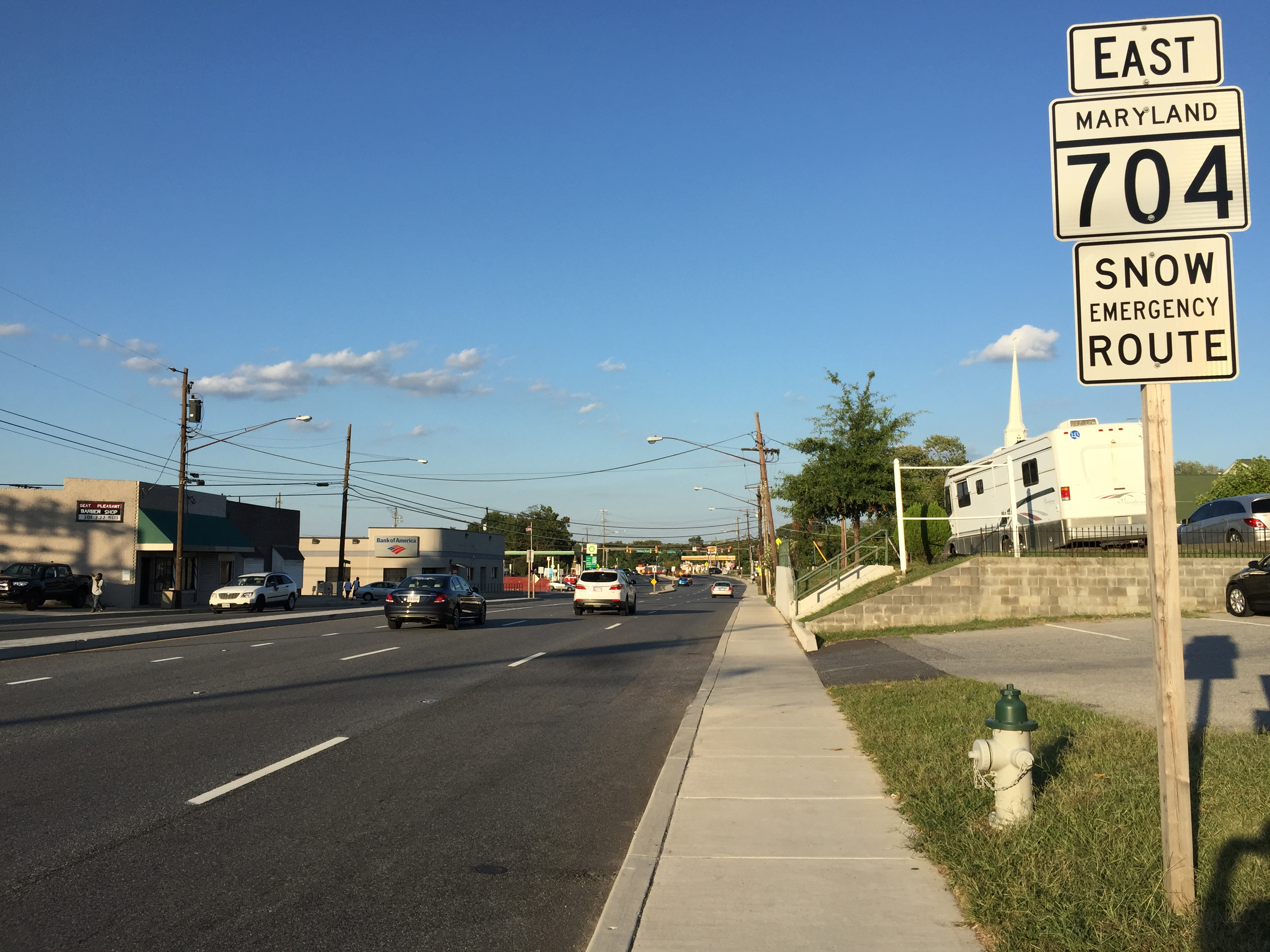
MD 704, the largest and busiest highway in Seat Pleasant

The main highway serving Seat Pleasant is Maryland Route 704. MD 704 connects southwest into Washington, D.C., and northeastward to U.S. Route 50 (John Hanson Highway).

The city is also served by the Addison Road and Capitol Heights Metro stations. Both stations are on the Blue Line and Silver Line.

== Law enforcement ==
The Seat Pleasant Police Department (SPPD) is the primary law enforcement agency servicing the municipality. The SPPD is assisted by the Prince George's County Police Department and the Sheriff's Office as directed by authority.

Prince George's County Police Department District 8 Station in Upper Marlboro CDP serves the community.

== Fire protection ==
The Seat Pleasant Volunteer Fire Company Inc, also known as the Infamous 8 House, was the primary fire department serving the community. It is located at 6305 Addison Road, Seat Pleasant. It was home to both career and volunteer firefighters and EMTs. It housed two engines, Engine 82 and 83, and Ambulance 88. The first due for the SPVFC was about 5.5 square miles (14 km^{2}). The total response area was about 38 square miles (98 km^{2}) serving over 250,000 citizens averaging about 7000 calls a year. In 2022, the Seat Pleasant Volunteer Fire Company was shut down. Fire protection for the town is now provided by the New Prince George's County Fire and EMS Department Station 802, as well as other surrounding fire stations.

== Bordering areas ==
- Carmody Hills (east)
- Peppermill Village (east)
- Summerfield (northeast)
- Landover (north)
- Fairmount Heights (northwest)
- Washington, D.C. (west)
- Capitol Heights (southwest)
- Walker Mill (south)

== Notable people ==
- Michael Beasley, 2007 graduate of Notre Dame Preparatory High School; played for the Kansas State University basketball team
- Joe Clair, also known by the nickname "Joe Cleezy", stand-up comedian, radio DJ, and VJ, best known as the former host of BET's Rap City from 1994 to 1999; native of Seat Pleasant
- Kevin Durant, 2006 graduate of Montrose Christian School and attended the University of Texas at Austin; 2014 NBA MVP and four-time Olympic champion, two time NBA Champion now playing for the NBA's Houston Rockets
