= Fairmont Heights High School =

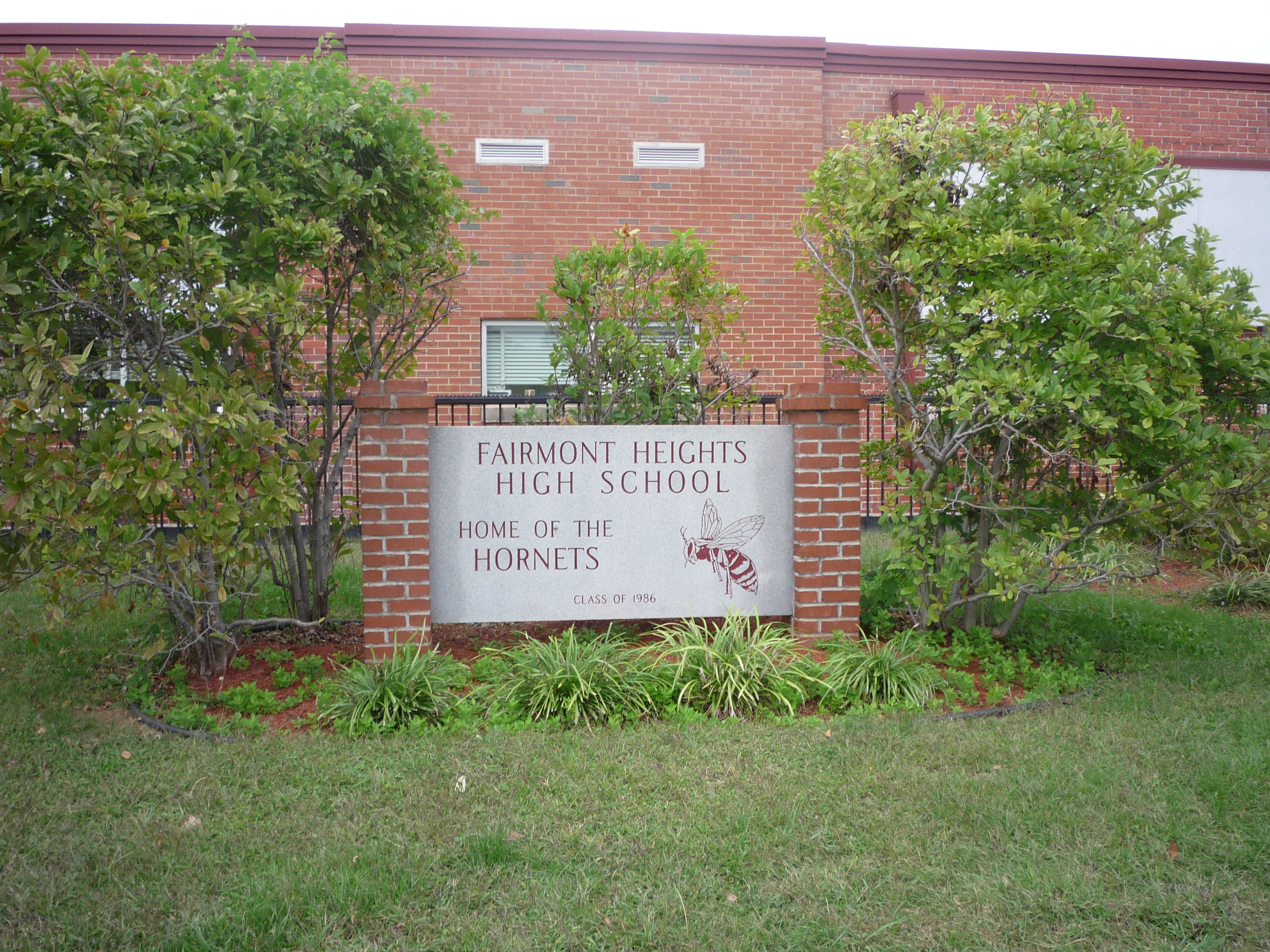
- Former campus (taken in 2009)

Location
- 6501 Columbia Park Road; Landover, Maryland 20785; United States
- Coordinates: 38°54′36″N 76°55′11″W

Information
- Type: Public Comprehensive Secondary School
- Established: 1950
- School district: Prince George's County Public Schools
- Oversight: Maryland State Department of Education
- Principal: Lonice Priester
- Grades: 9–12
- Enrollment: 751
- Colors: Maroon, Black, Gray, White
- Nickname: Hornets
- Newspaper: The Buzz
- Communities served: Fairmount Heights, Seat Pleasant, Kentland, Palmer Park, Chapel Oaks, Belle Haven
- Feeder schools: G. James Gholson Middle School, Kenmoor Middle School
- Website: www.pgcps.org/fairmontheights/

Fairmont Heights High School (est.1950) is an American public comprehensive secondary school located in Landover, Maryland, just outside Washington D.C. It is part of the Prince George's County Public Schools system. Two middle schools (G. James Gholson and Kenmoor, both in Landover) feed into Fairmont Heights. It is part of the School Board District 3.

== History ==
Fairmont Heights Junior-Senior High School first opened as a grade 7-12 school legally reserved for black children in 1950, initially having 738 students. Fairmont Heights Jr.-Sr. High was a merger of various secondary schools, including Lakeland High School. Lakeland, in College Park, was, along with than Frederick Douglass High School, then in Upper Marlboro, one of two senior high schools in Prince George's County reserved for black students. The cost to build the Fairmont Heights High campus was $1,500,000. Due to its capacity of 900 students, it was one of the four largest senior high schools in Prince George's County; the others were Bladensburg, Northwestern, and Suitland. James Gholson, previously the first principal of the Phoenix School in Virginia, was the first principal, selected by PGCPS supervisor of Negro schools Doswell E. Brooks. Gholson in turn selected the black teachers that he believed would provide the best educational experience to his students; all of the teachers were black at the time.

The school was originally named after the nearby town of Fairmount Heights. The name of the school differs slightly from the name of the town, as it is missing a "u". This is because of a mistake a contractor made when constructing the sign for the town's elementary school in 1934. When the high school was created, it kept the same spelling as the elementary school. According to Leon Wynter of The Washington Post, during the time the school was de jure segregated and during the first four years of post-formal desegregation, until the federal government asked PGCPS to change the attendance boundaries in 1969, "Fairmont Heights thrived in separate but equal isolation for 19 years, developing strong roots in the neighborhoods of Fairmont Heights, Capitol Heights and Beaver Heights." In the era of legally required segregation it served black students in western Prince George's County, Accokeek, Bowie, Laurel, Takoma Park, and other communities; this meant it served about 66% of the PGCPS black high school students.

The enrollment increased to 1,900 by 1960; it had portable buildings for the extra students. It was relieved by the opening of Mary McLeod Bethune Junior High School in 1961, and Fairmont Heights became grades 9-12 only; in 1962 it became grades 10-12 only. The school district desegregated after the Civil Rights Act was passed in 1964; it began having particular attendance boundaries for all races. Fairmont Heights High's first race-neutral attendance boundary was the smallest in size in the school district, totaling 3 square miles (7.8 km^{2}). The enrollment was majority African-American.

Gholson resigned as principal in 1968. Around 1969 Fairmount Heights had about 1,300 students. That year the school district received a request from the federal government to have more racial balance in the school attendance boundaries. The district adopted a desegregation plan in 1972, after the United States Department of Health, Education, and Welfare (HEW) persuaded the district to do so, so white students in other areas of the county could go to Fairmont Heights High. Instead enrollment dropped to 713 because white parents chose not to send their children to Fairmont Heights, preferring private schools or other public schools.

The Fairmont Heights community protested against two unsuccessful attempts to close the school, one of which would have converted the building into a performing arts facility. The two proposals occurred in 1972 and 1974, and Rodney Johnson, previously on the PGCPS board, and A. James Golato, then on the PGCPS, both wrote the performing arts proposal. According to Fairmont High Class of 1970 alumna and teacher Deborah Franklin, "There's a lot of emotion tied up in the school" and members of the Fairmont Heights area feared that the conversion "would just shut out the people in the community."

The school temporarily moved to the Kent Junior High School building after a January 4, 1980 fire damaged the building; the damages were estimated to be $500,000. Between 1980 and 1983 Fairmont Heights again received 9th grade students. In August 1983 the school moved back to the permanent facility, which received a $8,400,000 renovation. The district did not give the school an auditorium, even though the renovation plans originally called for that, because it did not have enough money.

In 2017, a new school was built along Columbia Park Road to replace the old Fairmont Heights school.

== Academics and programs ==
Fairmont Heights High School (often abbreviated FHHS) is part of the biotechnology magnet program along with Largo High School in Largo.

Fairmont Heights High School is also part of the Information Technology magnet program along with Bladensburg High School and Potomac High School. Many students just refer to FHHS as Fairmont.

Gholson, the school's first principal, implemented the "core program" which gave three-hour class periods so students could have Socratic dialogues with their teachers; at the time the other schools using this program were private.

=== Block schedule ===
In 2000, Fairmont Heights, along with the other Prince George's County public high and middle schools, adopted the "Alternating A/B Block Schedule". The A/B block allows students to take four alternating every-other-day classes all year. A-days consist of Period 1-4 and B-days consist of Period 5-8. Other schools offer periods 1, 3, 5, 7 on A-days and 2, 4, 6, 8 on B-days. All lunches take place during 3rd period.

== Campus ==
The original campus was on a 15-acre (6.1 ha) area, in unincorporated Prince George's County, outside of the Fairmount Heights town limits and with a Capitol Heights postal address. There were 40 classrooms and four rooms for vocational (woodshop) classes, and an initial student capacity of 900.

== Notable events ==
- Jay-Z visited FHHS in 2002
- Rev Jesse Jackson visited FHHS in 2009
- Charles M. Robinson - Class of 2002 - director and musician
- On September 5, 2017, the new $80 million building opened up to staff, students, and the community

== Communities served by Fairmont Heights ==
Fairmont Heights High School serves: portions of Landover CDP, the Town of Fairmount Heights, much of the City of Seat Pleasant, a small section of the Town of Cheverly, sections of Peppermill Village CDP and Summerfield CDP, and Chapel Oaks.

It serves portions of the Landover CDP which includes part of the communities Kentland, Palmer Park, Belle Haven, and Village Green.

== Athletics ==
Fairmont Heights Boys' basketball team won the 2017 Maryland 1A State Basketball Championship. Their first since 1981.
