= Peppermill Village, Maryland =

- Census-designated place
- Location within the U.S. state of Maryland Peppermill Village, Maryland (the United States)
- Coordinates: 38°53′41″N 76°53′12″W
- Country: United States
- State: Maryland
- County: Prince George's

Area
  - Total: 0.75 sq mi (1.94 km^{2})
  - Land: 0.75 sq mi (1.94 km^{2})
  - Water: 0 sq mi (0.00 km^{2})
- Elevation: 266 ft (81 m)

Population (2020)
  - Total: 5,264
  - Density: 7,024/sq mi (2,711.8/km^{2})
- Time zone: UTC−5 (Eastern (EST))
  - Summer (DST): UTC−4 (EDT)
- Area code: 301, 240
- FIPS code: 24-60950
- GNIS feature ID: 2391235

Peppermill Village is an unincorporated community near Maryland Route 214 (Central Avenue) in Prince George's County, Maryland, United States. As per the 2020 census, the population was 5,264. Northwest Stadium, Metrorail's Blue Line, and Hampton Mall shopping center are all located nearby. Because it is not formally incorporated, it has no official boundaries, but the United States Census Bureau has defined a census-designated place (CDP) consisting of Peppermill Village and the adjacent community of Carmody Hills, for statistical purposes.

== Geography ==
According to the U.S. Census Bureau, Peppermill Village had a total area of 0.73 square miles (1.9 km^{2}), all land. The CDP is bordered to the west and north by the city of Seat Pleasant, to the north and east by the Summerfield CDP, and to the south by the Walker Mill CDP. Peppermill Village is bounded to the east by Hill Road, west by Carmody Hills Drive, north by Seat Pleasant Drive and south by Maryland Route 214, or Central Avenue, which to the west becomes East Capitol Street in the District of Columbia and to the east connects with the Capital Beltway and the town of Largo.

== Demographics ==
Historical population
Census	Pop.	Note	%±
2000	4,801		—
2010	4,895		2.0%
2020	5,264		7.5%
U.S. Decennial Census; 2010 2020

=== Racial and ethnic composition ===
Peppermill Village CDP, Maryland – Racial and ethnic composition Note: the US Census treats Hispanic/Latino as an ethnic category. This table excludes Latinos from the racial categories and assigns them to a separate category. Hispanics/Latinos may be of any race.
Race / Ethnicity (NH = Non-Hispanic)	Pop 2000	Pop 2010	Pop 2020	% 2000	% 2010	% 2020
White alone (NH)	70	50	86	1.46%	1.02%	1.63%
Black or African American alone (NH)	4,643	4,482	4,254	96.71%	91.56%	80.81%
Native American or Alaska Native alone (NH)	7	26	14	0.15%	0.53%	0.27%
Asian alone (NH)	7	13	28	0.15%	0.27%	0.53%
Native Hawaiian or Pacific Islander alone (NH)	0	0	2	0.00%	0.00%	0.04%
Other race alone (NH)	0	3	16	0.00%	0.06%	0.30%
Mixed race or Multiracial (NH)	50	64	119	1.04%	1.31%	2.26%
Hispanic or Latino (any race)	24	257	745	0.50%	5.25%	14.15%
Total	4,801	4,895	5,264	100.00%	100.00%	100.00%

=== 2020 census ===
As of the 2020 census, Peppermill Village had a population of 5,264. The median age was 37.1 years. 24.3% of residents were under the age of 18 and 15.8% of residents were 65 years of age or older. For every 100 females there were 83.7 males, and for every 100 females age 18 and over there were 77.9 males age 18 and over.

100.0% of residents lived in urban areas, while 0.0% lived in rural areas.

There were 1,816 households, of which 35.2% had children under the age of 18 living in them. Of all households, 30.0% were married-couple households, 17.0% were households with a male householder and no spouse or partner present, and 48.0% were households with a female householder and no spouse or partner present. About 24.9% of all households were made up of individuals and 9.2% had someone living alone who was 65 years of age or older.

There were 1,904 housing units, of which 4.6% were vacant. The homeowner vacancy rate was 1.3% and the rental vacancy rate was 4.9%.

=== 2010 census ===
The population of the CDP was 4,895 at the 2010 census. For previous censuses, the CDP was named "Carmody Hills-Pepper Mill Village".

It has a majority African-American population.

== Schools ==
The CDP is served by the Prince George's County Public Schools district.

Almost all of the CDP is zoned to Carmbody Hills elementary while a small section is zoned to Cora L. Rice Elementary. All residents are zoned to G. James Gholson Middle School. Most CDP residents are zoned to Central High School while some are zoned to Fairmont Heights High School and .
