= Capitol Heights, Maryland =

Town in Maryland, United States

- Town
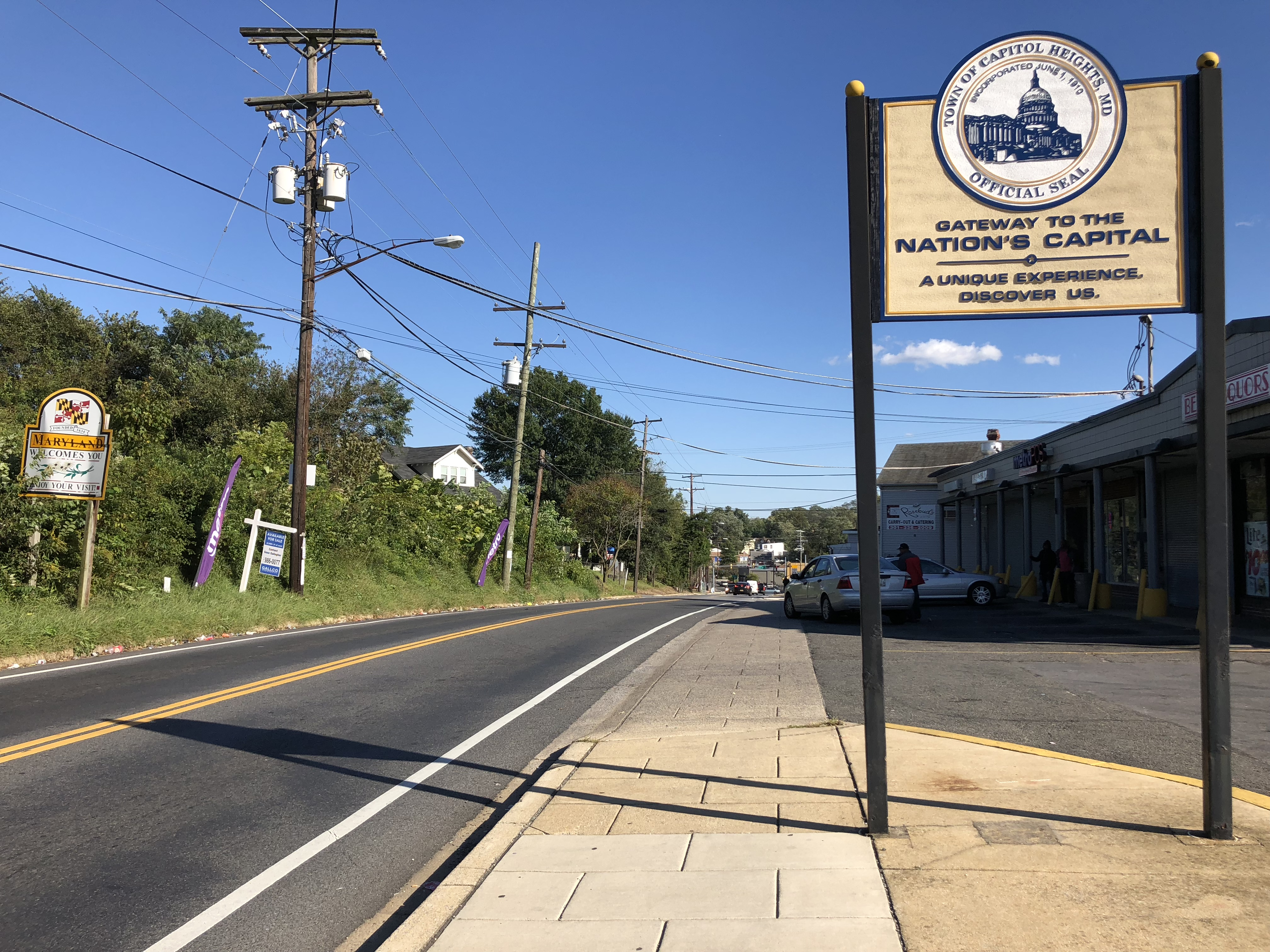
- View east along Maryland State Route 332 (Central Avenue) at Southern Avenue in Capitol Heights

- Flag Seal Logo

- Location of Capitol Heights, Maryland
- Coordinates: 38°52′55″N 76°54′52″W
- Country: United States of America
- State: Maryland
- County: Prince George's
- Incorporated: 1910

Area
  - Total: 0.78 sq mi (2.02 km^{2})
  - Land: 0.78 sq mi (2.02 km^{2})
  - Water: 0 sq mi (0.00 km^{2})
- Elevation: 121 ft (37 m)

Population (2020)
  - Total: 4,050
  - Density: 5,187.0/sq mi (2,002.72/km^{2})
- Time zone: UTC-5 (Eastern (EST))
  - Summer (DST): UTC-4 (EDT)
- ZIP codes: 20700-20799
- Area codes: 301, 240
- FIPS code: 24-13000
- GNIS feature ID: 0597177
- Website: www.capitolheightsmd.com

Capitol Heights is a town in Prince George's County, Maryland, United States, located on the border of both the Northeast & Southeast quadrants of Washington. Per the 2020 census, the population was 4,050. The town of Capitol Heights is officially bounded between Southern Avenue NE/SE to the north, Yost Place, and Eastern Avenue NE to the east, the Watts Branch Stream, Brooke Road, and Capitol Heights Boulevard to the south, and Marlboro Pike to the west. The zip code of Capitol Heights is 20743.

== Adjacent areas ==
- Coral Hills (west and southwest)
- Seat Pleasant (northeast)
- Walker Mill (southeast)

== Geography ==
Capitol Heights is located at 38°52′55″N 76°54′52″W (38.881862, -76.914474). East Capitol Street (MD 214), which is a major street in Capitol Heights, evenly divides the Northeast and Southeast quadrants of Washington after leaving Capitol Heights and entering Washington.

Whereas Capitol Heights itself is an incorporated town in Prince George's County, adjacent unincorporated areas such as Coral Hills, Walker Mill, Pepper Mill Village, Carmody Hills, Fairmount Heights, and Chapel Oaks, fall within the Capitol Heights zipcode of 20743 and have Capitol Heights addresses.

According to the United States Census Bureau, the town has a total area of 0.80 square miles (2.07 km^{2}), all land.

== History ==
In 1904, Washington, D.C., was growing by leaps and bounds. The overcrowding and the improved public transportation made the idea of living on the outskirts increasingly appealing to people looking for housing. Recognizing the opportunity, Baltimore resident Otway B. Zantzinger acquired 400 hilly acres just beyond the eastern corner of the District of Columbia. He divided the tract into 4,000 lots and began to sell them at prices ranging from $20 to $150 each. He advertised a picturesque view of Washington, D.C., a proposed electric railway, drinking water from crystal-clear springs, nothing down and a dollar a month, no interest, no landlords, and, in the custom and vernacular of the times, "no colored people." Many buyers bought two lots in this haven that was to become Capitol Heights.

While awaiting their "proposed electric railway," commuters to the city could walk about a mile (often through mud) to the District Line station at what is now Seat Pleasant and board a rail car into Washington, DC.

The absence of paved roads, sidewalks, street lights, and other public services, including the electric railway, began to cast a pall over Zantzinger's vision of bliss. In 1910, the approximately 200 householders voted to incorporate their community as Capitol Heights. Over the next 50 years, the town made strides in improving its infrastructure and services. It established its own fire department and public works department and built facilities to house them and other elements of the government. By the 1970s, when its population had reached about 3,800, the town's central business district had started to decline.

In 1980, that long-promised "electric railway" finally arrived. Capitol Heights got its own station on the Washington Metro Blue Line, providing easy access to the entire metropolitan region and national transportation facilities. The land around the station has been declared an Enterprise Zone, which the town is promoting as one of its paths to restoring prosperity. Today, over 90% of the population of Capitol Heights is African American and the town has had four African-American mayors.

=== Previous mayors ===
- 1946-1950 Thomas A. Shaw
- 1950-1952 Harvey E. Ennis
- 1952-1954 Joseph Gainer
- 1954-1964 Elmer L. Hockman
- 1964-1986 Leo P. Forami
- 1986-2002 Vivian M. Dodson
- 2002-2006 Joyce Ayers Nixon
- 2006-2010 Darrell A. Miller
- 2010-2014 Kito James
- 2014-2018 Marnitta L. King
- 2018-2021 Shawn M. Maldon

== Town council ==
- Linda Monroe, Mayor
- Amanda Anderson, Council Member
- Anita Anderson, Council Member
- LaTonya Chew, Council Member
- Faith T. Ford, Council Member
- Victor James Council Member
- Rhonda Akers, Council member

== Demographics ==
Historical population
Census	Pop.	Note	%±
1920	1,194		—
1930	1,611		34.9%
1940	2,036		26.4%
1950	2,729		34.0%
1960	3,138		15.0%
1970	3,835		22.2%
1980	3,271		−14.7%
1990	3,633		11.1%
2000	4,138		13.9%
2010	4,337		4.8%
2020	4,050		−6.6%
U.S. Decennial Census; 2010 2020

=== Racial and ethnic composition ===
Capitol Heights town, Maryland – Racial and ethnic composition Note: the US Census treats Hispanic/Latino as an ethnic category. This table excludes Latinos from the racial categories and assigns them to a separate category. Hispanics/Latinos may be of any race.
Race / Ethnicity (NH = Non-Hispanic)	Pop 2000	Pop 2010	Pop 2020	% 2000	% 2010	% 2020
White alone (NH)	196	110	79	4.74%	2.54%	1.95%
Black or African American alone (NH)	3,822	3,920	3,294	92.36%	90.39%	81.33%
Native American or Alaska Native alone (NH)	11	3	12	0.27%	0.07%	0.30%
Asian alone (NH)	15	5	15	0.36%	0.12%	0.37%
Native Hawaiian or Pacific Islander alone (NH)	0	0	0	0.00%	0.00%	0.00%
Other race alone (NH)	8	1	22	0.19%	0.02%	0.54%
Mixed race or Multiracial (NH)	50	65	94	1.21%	1.50%	2.32%
Hispanic or Latino (any race)	36	233	534	0.87%	5.37%	13.19%
Total	4,138	4,337	4,050	100.00%	100.00%	100.00%

=== 2020 census ===
As of the 2020 census, Capitol Heights had a population of 4,050. The median age was 37.5 years. 22.2% of residents were under the age of 18 and 13.6% of residents were 65 years of age or older. For every 100 females there were 82.6 males, and for every 100 females age 18 and over there were 80.1 males age 18 and over.

100.0% of residents lived in urban areas, while 0.0% lived in rural areas.

There were 1,504 households in Capitol Heights, of which 35.8% had children under the age of 18 living in them. Of all households, 26.4% were married-couple households, 22.3% were households with a male householder and no spouse or partner present, and 45.5% were households with a female householder and no spouse or partner present. About 31.2% of all households were made up of individuals and 11.2% had someone living alone who was 65 years of age or older.

There were 1,593 housing units, of which 5.6% were vacant. The homeowner vacancy rate was 3.3% and the rental vacancy rate was 3.3%.

=== 2010 census ===
As of the census of 2010, there were 4,337 people, 1,482 households, and 1,040 families residing in the town. The population density was 5,421.3 inhabitants per square mile (2,093.2/km^{2}). There were 1,622 housing units at an average density of 2,027.5 per square mile (782.8/km^{2}). The racial makeup of the town was 3.3% White, 91.3% African American, 0.3% Native American, 0.1% Asian, 3.1% from other races, and 1.9% from two or more races. Hispanic or Latino of any race were 5.4% of the population.

There were 1,482 households, of which 42.0% had children under the age of 18 living with them, 34.0% were married couples living together, 28.4% had a female householder with no husband present, 7.8% had a male householder with no wife present, and 29.8% were non-families. 25.1% of all households were made up of individuals, and 7.3% had someone living alone who was 65 years of age or older. The average household size was 2.92 and the average family size was 3.48.

The median age in the town was 34.9 years. 27.3% of residents were under the age of 18; 10.3% were between the ages of 18 and 24; 27.3% were from 25 to 44; 26.1% were from 45 to 64; and 9.1% were 65 years of age or older. The gender makeup of the town was 46.0% male and 54.0% female.

=== 2000 census ===
As of the census of 2000, there were 4,138 people, 1,441 households, and 1,014 families residing in the town. The population density was 5,047.3 inhabitants per square mile (1,948.8/km^{2}). There were 1,603 housing units at an average density of 1,955.2 per square mile (754.9/km^{2}). The racial makeup of the town was 92.85% Black or African American, 4.81% White, 0.27% Native American, 0.36% Asian, 0.36% from other races, and 1.35% from two or more races. Hispanic or Latino of any race were 0.87% of the population.

There were 1,441 households, out of which 37.5% had children under the age of 18 living with them, 35.2% were married couples living together, 28.5% had a female householder with no husband present, and 29.6% were non-families. 25.7% of all households were made up of individuals, and 8.0% had someone living alone who was 65 years of age or older. The average household size was 2.87 and the average family size was 3.41.

In the town, the population was spread out, with 30.8% under the age of 18, 6.9% from 18 to 24, 32.6% from 25 to 44, 21.4% from 45 to 64, and 8.3% who were 65 years of age or older. The median age was 34 years. For every 100 females, there were 84.8 males. For every 100 females age 18 and over, there were 78.8 males.

The median income for a household in the town was $46,667, and the median income for a family was $53,826. Males had a median income of $36,950 versus $35,225 for females. The per capita income for the town was $18,932. About 9.3% of families and 11.4% of the population were below the poverty line, including 15.8% of those under age 18 and 9.6% of those age 65 or over.

== Government ==
The Town of Capitol Heights operates under the council-manager form of government. The Town Administrator serves as chief administrative officer and directly reports to the Town Council. The Town has approximately 20.0 FTE (full-time equivalents) who serve in the following areas:

- Beverly Habada, Town Administrator
- Community Relations and Outreach
- Economic Development
- Finance Department
- Human Resources
- Neighborhood Services Department
- Police Department
- Recreational Department
- Town Clerk (Business License and Permitting)

The U.S. Postal Service operates the Capitol Heights Post Office.

== Law enforcement ==
Capitol Heights is served by its own police department. Chief Darryl Morgan serves as the Chief of Police.

Prince George's County Police Department District 8 Station in Upper Marlboro CDP serves the community.

== Transportation ==
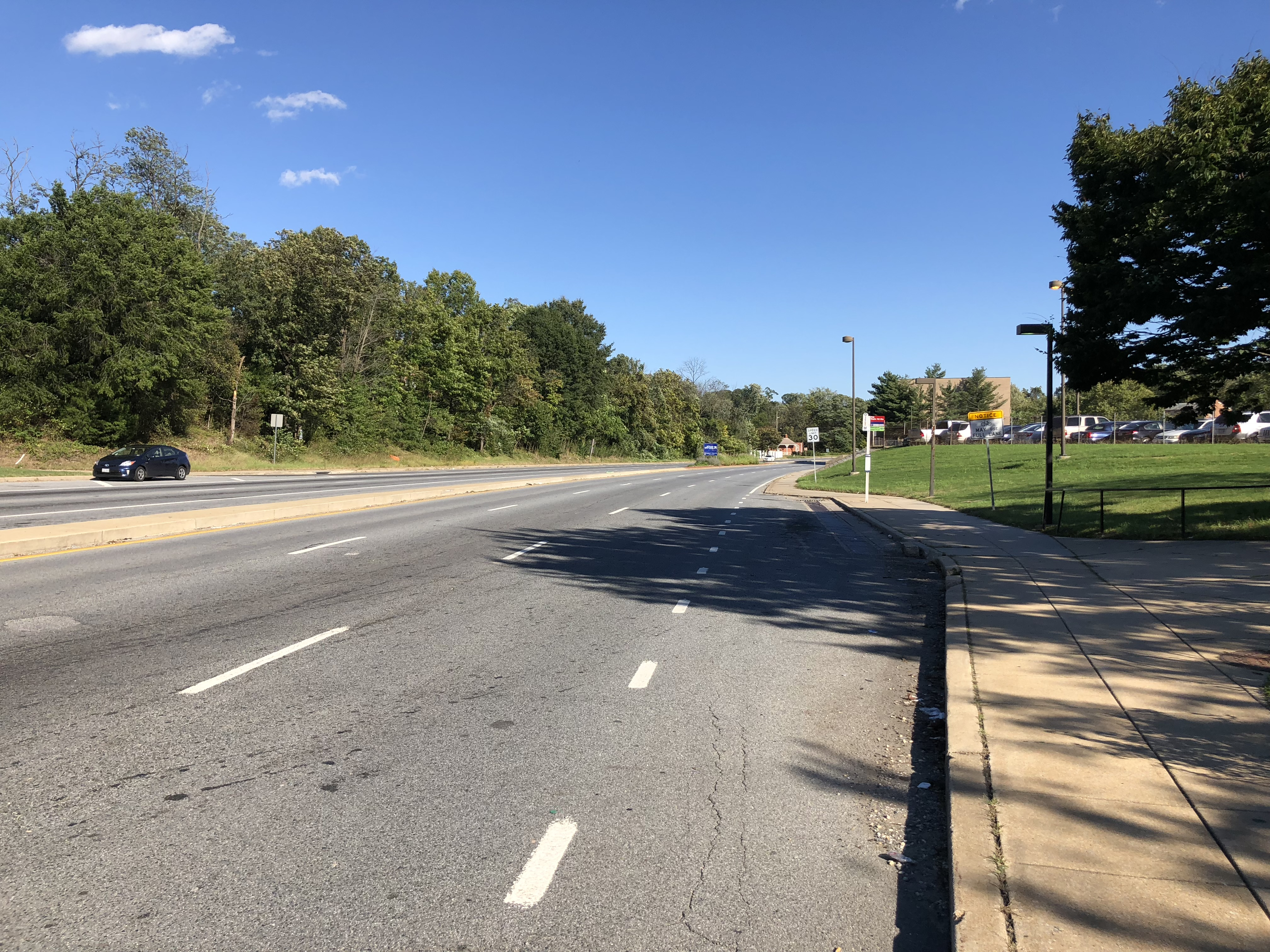
MD 214, the largest highway in Capitol Heights

The primary highway serving Capitol Heights is Maryland Route 214. MD 214 extends west to Washington, D.C. (connecting with East Capitol Street) and east to Interstate 95/Interstate 495 (Capital Beltway). Maryland Route 332 also serves Capitol Heights, following an old alignment of MD 214.

== Community organizations ==
The Capitol Heights/Seat Pleasant chapter of the Prince George's County Boys and Girls Club, supports the youth with after-school programs and athletic programs, along with mentoring boys and girls.

The Capitol Heights conflict-mediation program focuses on resolving differences between youths in the area.

== Education ==
Capitol Heights is a part of the Prince George's County Public Schools system. Residential areas of Capitol Heights are zoned to the following schools: Zoned elementary schools for the municipal limits are Capitol Heights, William Hall, and Doswell Brooks. William Hall and Walker Mill middle schools serve sections of the municipality. Central High School and Suitland High School serve sections of the municipality.

== Notable people ==
- Chad Scott, American football cornerback in the NFL, played for Pittsburgh Steelers and the New England Patriots
- James Tillman (1919–2009), Negro league baseball player, and a long time resident of Capitol Heights
