= Central High School (Maryland) =

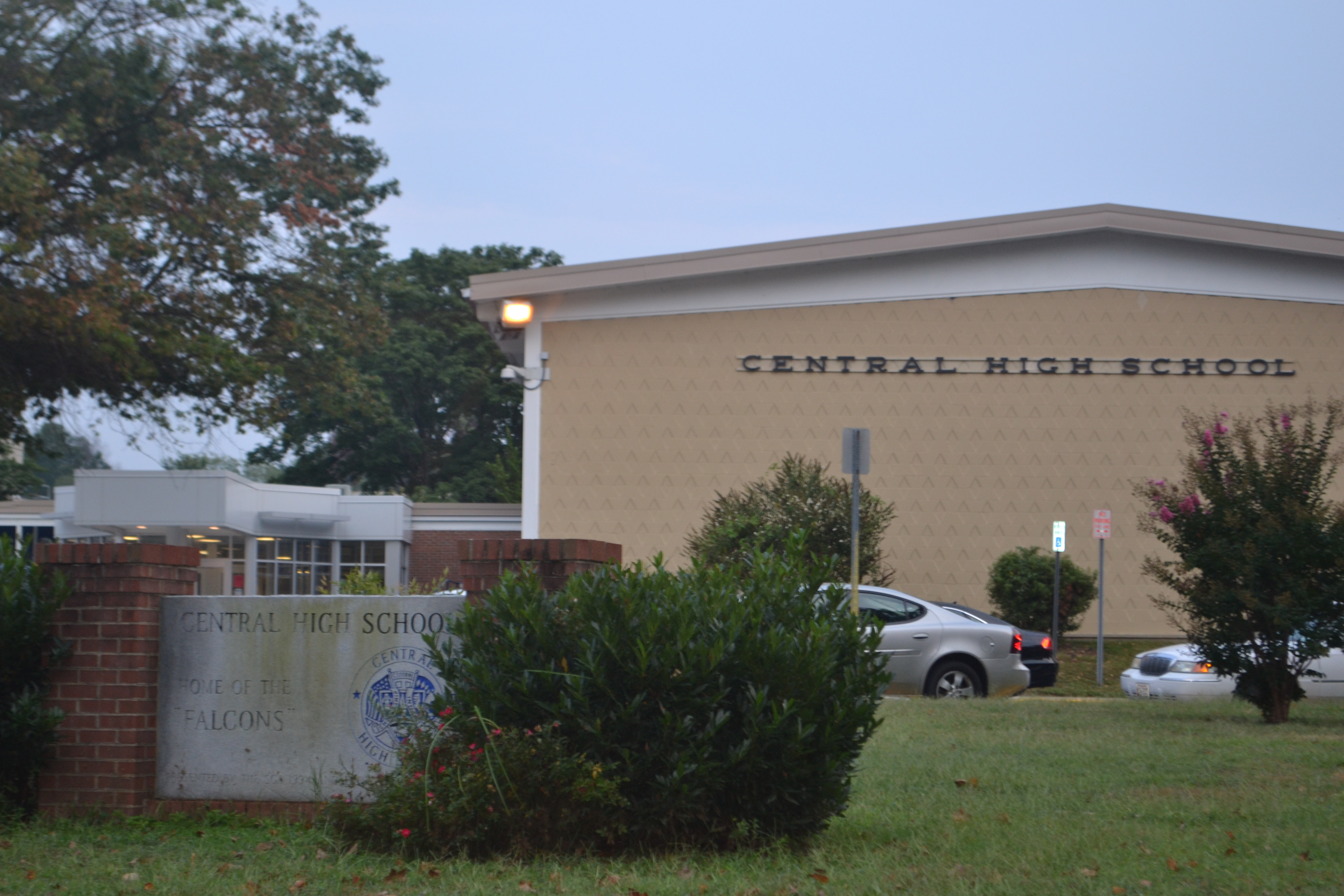

Location
- 200 Cabin Branch Rd, Capitol Heights, MD 20743; Capitol Heights, Maryland 20743; United States
- Coordinates: 38°52′58″N 76°53′28″W

Information
- School type: Public, high school
- Established: 1961
- School district: Prince George's County Public Schools
- Superintendent: Shawn Joseph
- Principal: Sheree N. Savoy
- Teaching staff: 72.0 (on an FTE basis)
- Grades: 9–12
- Enrollment: 754 (2024-25)
- Student to teacher ratio: 13.94
- Language: English, French
- Campus: Suburban
- Colors: Navy Blue, Light Blue, White
- Nickname: Falcons
- Feeder schools: G. James Gholson Middle School; Walker Mill Middle School
- Website: https://www.pgcps.org/central/

Central High School is a public magnet high school, located in the Walker Mill census-designated place in unincorporated Prince George's County, Maryland, United States, with a Capitol Heights mailing address. The school is part of the Prince George's County Public Schools system. The school hosts the county's only high school-level French Immersion magnet program, as well as an International Baccalaureate (IB) magnet program. The school also participates in the Advancement Via Individual Determination program. The principal is Keishia Wallace.

Central High serves: most of Walker Mill, a section of the Town of Capitol Heights, a section of the City of Seat Pleasant, most of Peppermill Village CDP, and a portion of Summerfield CDP.

== History ==
Central High School was founded in 1961. The school building was closed for the 2019–2020 school year for a $20 million HVAC repair project. Students will be relocated to the former Forestville High School building.

== Notable alumni ==
- Cornell Gowdy, former NFL player
- Charles Alston
- Archie Talley
- Nino Paid , rapper
