= Rogers Heights, Maryland =

Unincorporated community in Maryland, United States

Rogers Heights
- Unincorporated community
- Rogers Heights Elementary School

- Location within the state of Maryland Rogers Heights (the United States)
- Coordinates: 38°56′55″N 76°55′19″W
- Country: United States of America
- State: Maryland
- County: Prince George's
- Time zone: UTC-5 (Eastern (EST))
  - Summer (DST): UTC-4 (EDT)
- GNIS feature ID: 597980

Rogers Heights is an unincorporated community in Prince George's County, Maryland, United States.

== History ==
The Rogers Heights subdivision is bounded on the north by 1950s-era subdivisions, on the south and east by Bladensburg, and on the west by Edmonston. Named after one of the former owners of the land tract, Rogers Heights was developed between 1938 and 1952. Two factors contributed largely to the selection of this tract for development; roadways and sewers. The subdivision was located along or close to major roadways. Rogers Heights is located along Edmonston Avenue, a north-south route later rebuilt as Kenilworth Avenue. This road gave residents access to Bladensburg and the Bladensburg Road into the District of Columbia. Residents could also travel west on Decatur Street to the growing center of Hyattsville and access U.S. Route 1. The second factor in the settlement of Rogers Heights was the availability of public sewer lines from Bladensburg.

By 1942, the Rogers Heights subdivision contained ten residential blocks and approximately 200 residences. The streets were laid out in a grid pattern with three roads extending east from Edmonston Avenue intersected by five north-south streets. Roads constructed between 1942 and 1957 to the east of the earlier blocks were slightly more curvilinear. The common building type constructed was the modest brick and frame ranch. Scattered commercial properties are located along Edmonston and Kenilworth Avenues. However, most of the retail facilities are clustered around the Riverdale Plaza, in nearby Riverdale Park.

The area is served by Rogers Heights elementary school and Bladensburg High School; Elizabeth Seton High School (Catholic, girls-only) and the Bladensburg Community Center Park are also located in Bladensburg, immediately adjacent to Rogers Heights.
