= Frederick Douglass High School (Croom, Maryland) =

Location
- 8000 Croom Road; Upper Marlboro, Maryland 20772; United States; 38°46′54″N 76°46′59″W

Information
- Other names: Marlboro High School
- School type: Public, high school
- Opened: 1935
- School district: Prince George's County Public Schools
- Superintendent: Shawn Joesph
- Principal: Dr. David Curry
- Grades: 9–12
- Enrollment: 1,011
- Language: English
- Campus: Suburban
- Colors: Burgundy and Gold
- Mascot: Eagles
- Rival: Gwynn Park High School
- Feeder schools: James Madison Middle School
- Website: www.pgcps.org/douglass

Frederick Douglass High School (FDHS), is an American public high school established in 1935 and located in the Croom census-designated place of unincorporated Prince George's County, Maryland, United States, with a mailing address of Upper Marlboro and near Upper Marlboro.

It started as a segregated school for African American students, and c. 1964 it became integrated. Douglass is a part of the Prince George's County Public Schools system, and is named after the famous abolitionist, journalist, and orator, Frederick Douglass. It was preceded by Marlboro Colored High School (1923–1935).

== About ==
The school serves: sections of the Croom and Rosaryville CDPs, and all of the Marlton CDP.

The current principal is Eddie Scott. The July 2019 student enrollment was approximately 1,050 students in grades nine through twelve. The school hours are from 7:20am to 2:10pm. There is a mandatory uniform policy in effect at Douglass. The school features an International Baccalaureate (IB) Middle Years Programme (MYP) a P-TECH program as well as a school-wide America's Choice School Design signature program.

== History ==
Frederick Douglass High School was preceded by the Marlboro Colored High School. In 1935 a new building serving elementary through high school opened, and the school was given its current name. The former building was converted into offices. The present Frederick Douglass High School campus at 8000 Croom Road opened in 1959.

In the period 1950 to 1964, Douglass served about 33% of the county's Black high school students; the remainder attended Fairmont Heights High School, then near Fairmount Heights, which opened in 1950. Circa 1964 PGCPS ended legalized racial segregation of schools. When the late 1960s came, Douglass was a majority white high school because a lot of the black high school students were reassigned to schools closer to their houses. By 2000 Douglass returned to being majority black.

In the early 1980s the former Douglass High was razed. A commemorative plaque was installed at the site in September 2000 by the Frederick Douglass High School Class of 1950.

== Campus ==
The school is the Croom census-designated place of unincorporated Prince George's County, Maryland, with a mailing address of Upper Marlboro; it is 4 miles (6.4 km) southeast of Upper Marlboro. The school was previously defined by the U.S. Census Bureau as being in the Greater Upper Marlboro CDP.

Around 2016 the official capacity of Douglass was over 1,400 students, but it previously had an official capacity of 1,283. The PGCPS operations officer, Monica Goldson, stated that the Douglass principal reviewed the new number and that the district took into account the total classroom space. Board member Sonya Williams advocated for the former capacity and feared that the school district could use the new capacity to officially state the school was under-enrolled and close it at a later time.

In 2015 the school received a new tennis court and rubberized field; the upgrades to its athletic facilities totaled $317,270.

The media center is named after former principal Robert F. Frisby, who had the nickname "Baldy".

== Student body ==
In the pre-1964 segregation era many of the students previously attended rural one and two schoolhouses and lived in rural residences with no electricity, telephone, and/or water services.

Pre-1964 many students who graduated from Douglass matriculated to Bowie State University (previously Maryland Normal and Industrial School at Bowie, Maryland Teachers College at Bowie, and Bowie State College) and University of Maryland Eastern Shore (then known as Maryland State College), as well as Hampton University (formerly Hampton Agricultural and Industrial School, and later Hampton Institute).

== Athletics ==
Pre-1964 Douglass entered in athletic competitions with Cardozo Education Campus (formerly Cardozo High School) in Washington, Carver High School in Rockville, Bel Alton High School in Charles County, and schools in Baltimore.

== Notable people ==
- Karen Handel, U.S. Representative and former Georgia Secretary of State, 2007-2010
- Shawne Merriman, former American football linebacker in the National Football League, 2005-2012
