= Leary School =

Coordinates: 38°49′40.8″N 77°8′53.5″W

- 6349 Lincolnia Road, Alexandria

Information
- Type: Private
- Established: 1964
- Principal: Ed Schultze
- Grades: 3-12
- Enrollment: 110
- Campus: Suburban
- Color: None
- Athletics conference: Metro Athletic League
- Mascot: None
- Website: http://www.learyschool.org/main_va_profile.htm

Leary School of Alexandria, Virginia, was a special school for students with emotional, behavioral and learning problems. It is one of two campuses formerly operated by the Lincolnia Educational Foundation, Inc., a non-public, non-profit organization. The other campus was located in Oxon Hill, Maryland.

Timber Ridge School in Cross Junction, Virginia, a residential treatment center for boys and young men aged 10–21, opened in 1971 by the same organization, is currently operated by the Leary Educational Trust, Inc.

== History ==
Leary School was founded in 1964 by Al and Barbara Leary. It was created to serve the needs of students with emotional, behavioral, and learning difficulties, at a time when special education was not yet mandated. By the 1970s, it operated three programs in northern Virginia: two day schools in Falls Church and Alexandria, and a residential center in Winchester, which would later become Timber Ridge.

After laws guaranteeing the right to special education were passed in the mid-1970s, public school districts began referring students to Leary. In the 1980s it developed its "jobsite" vocational program, initially in Fairfax, in which students built and renovated houses.

In the 1990s, Leary School expanded to Maryland, opening a school in Prince George’s County. The Lincolnia Educational Foundation was established to manage the schools after the original leadership retired. Leary School Jobsites were set up in Loudoun County, Virginia in 2006 and in Brandywine, Maryland in 2009.

By the early 2000s, referrals had decreased as more public schools had developed their own special education programs. Financial challenges led to its closure in 2010. The school's vocational programs were transferred to the Phillips Program in Annandale, Virginia.
