= Suitland High School =

School in Maryland, United States

Location
- 5200 Silver Hill Road; District Heights, Prince George's County, Maryland; United States; 38°51′16.5″N 76°55′3″W

Information
- School type: Public, Magnet High School
- Motto: "Falling Forward Toward Student Achievement"
- Founded: November 15, 1951
- School district: Prince George's County Public Schools
- Superintendent: Millard House II
- Principal: Maurice Wright
- Grades: 9–12
- Enrollment: 1,834
- Language: English
- Campus size: 32,039.9 m^{2} (344,875 sq ft)
- Colors: Scarlet Red and White
- Athletics conference: 4A
- Mascot: Ram
- Feeder schools: Drew-Freeman Middle School; Andrew Jackson Academy; William W. Hall Academy
- Website: School website School district website

Suitland High School is a public school with in Prince George's County, Maryland, operated by Prince George's County Public Schools.

The school serves all of Suitland, a section of the City of District Heights, a section of the Town of Capitol Heights, all of Coral Hills, portions of Forestville, and a portion of Silver Hill.

The current principal is Mr. Maurice Wright.

== History ==
Suitland High (formerly Suitland Senior High) is the first high school in the Suitland area. The school's doors officially opened on November 15, 1951. The dedication ceremony, presided over by John W. McNamara, featured Principal Thomas Warthen accepting the dedication on behalf of the students and faculty.

In 1978, Walter R. Battle became principal of Suitland Senior High School. Initially serving students in grades 10th through 12th, the school underwent a restructuring in 1981, incorporating 9th-grade students and removing the "senior" designation from its name. Dr. Joe Hairston played a significant role in the school's transformation as a magnet school in 1987 and served as the principal until the mid-1990s.

On January 20, 1988, President Ronald Reagan delivered a notable speech at Suitland High, using the occasion to announce $115 million nationwide in magnet school funding. The selection of Suitland High School as the site for the president's address was influenced by several factors. Despite facing persistent challenges, the school's status as a fruitful magnet school played a crucial role in its selection.

In 2009, Sheryll Cashin highlighted Suitland High School, along with several other predominantly black and middle-class public high schools in Prince George's County, as underperforming institutions. She noted in The Failures of Integration: How Race and Class are Undermining the American Dream that less than half of the seniors from these schools had enrolled in four-year colleges in recent years, reflecting a concerning trend.

Commencing with the 2016–2017 school year, students who were previously enrolled at the now-closed Forestville High School were redirected to Suitland.

In 2022, Suitland High School was one of the four schools in PGCPS that faced bomb threats.

As of September 2022, Suitland High School had an estimated student enrollment of approximately 1,834 students across grades 9–12. A new multimillion dollar campus is expected to open in 2026.

The school adheres to a mandatory uniform policy.

== Academics ==
=== Center for the Visual and Performing Arts (CVPA) ===
The Center for the Visual and Performing Arts is a four-year arts program for high school students across Prince George's County.

Established in 1986, the Center for the Visual and Performing Arts operates as a distinctive school-within-a-school at Suitland High School.

=== Naval Junior Reserve Officers' Training Corps (NJROTC) ===
The NJROTC (Naval Junior Reserve Officers' Training Corps) Unit at Suitland High School was established in May 1982. This program offers a comprehensive curriculum that focuses on the development of citizenship, leadership skills, and a deep appreciation for maritime heritage, sea power, and naval subjects. Students enrolled in NJROTC gain knowledge in various areas, including naval operations, seamanship, navigation, and meteorology.

== New campus groundbreaking and renovation ==
In June 2022, Prince George's County Public Schools held a groundbreaking ceremony on a new $335 million campus expected to be open for enrollment by 2026, marking the first full-scale renovation of the school since its inception in 1951. The new Suitland High School will accommodate 2,000 students (including 500 enrolled in the Center for Visual and Performing Arts program). Notably, the new facility will only house the traditional high school and CVPA programs, allowing a focus on performing arts. The Career and Technical Education (CTE) programs have been relocated to nearby Crossland High School, establishing it as the new CTE hub for south county residents.

== Notable alumni ==
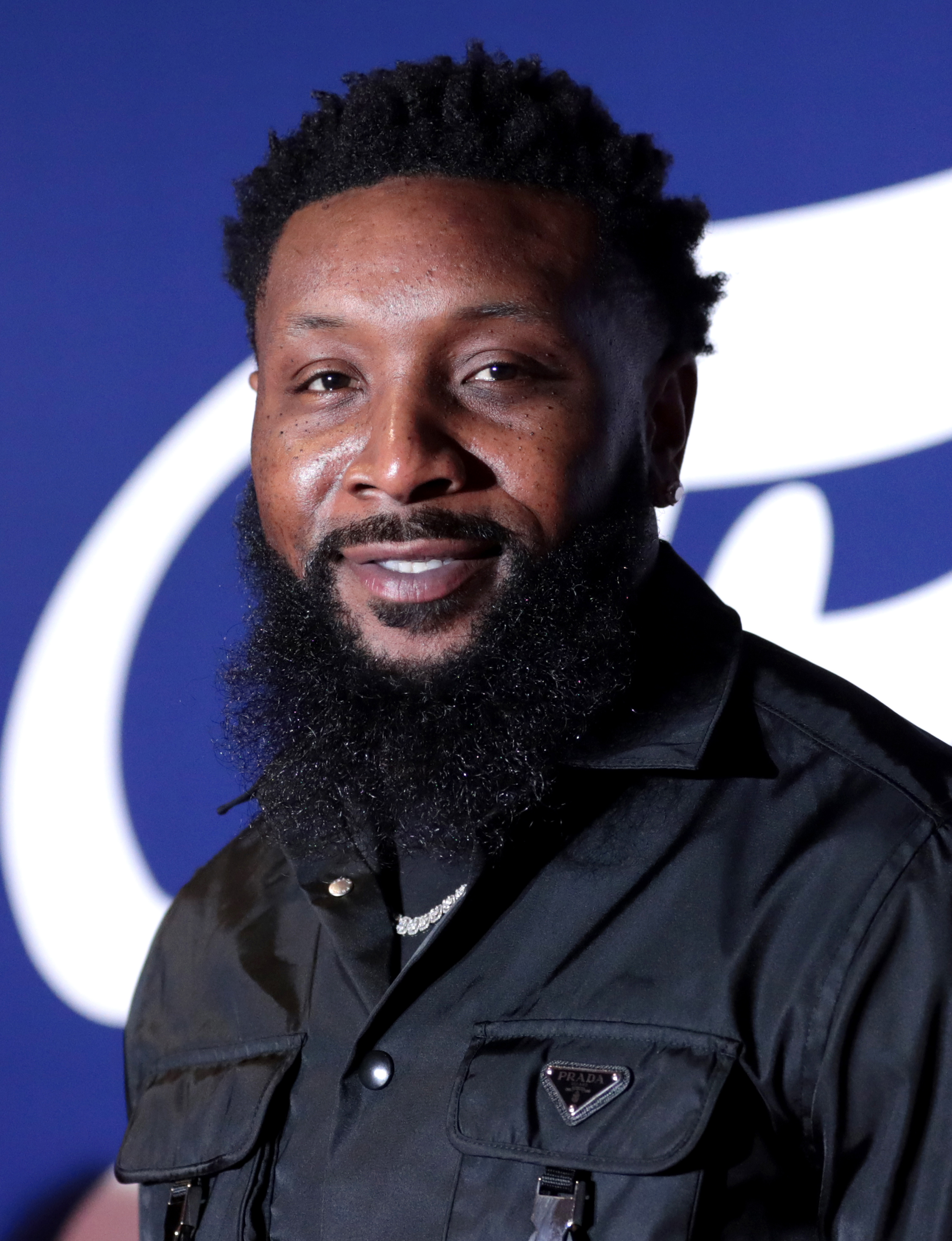
Former Penn State and NFL linebacker NaVorro Bowman

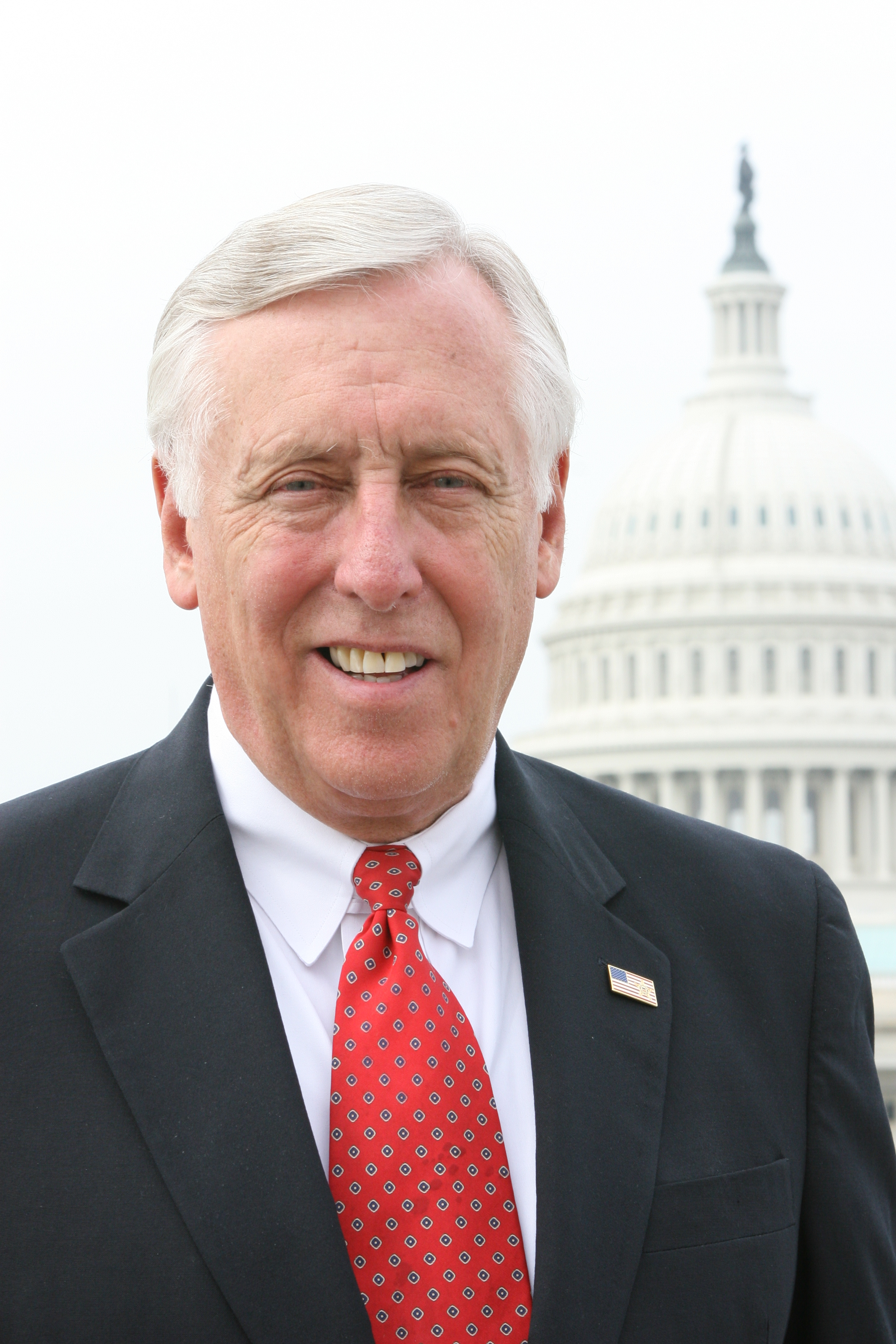
Former House Majority Leader Steny Hoyer (D-MD)

- Andrew Bayes – NFL football player
- NaVorro Bowman – Penn State and NFL football player
- John E. Courtney, PhD – CEO of American Society for Nutrition
- George O. Gore II – American actor, New York Undercover, My Wife and Kids
- Peter Greenberg – cancer researcher and professor, Stanford University School of Medicine
- Steny Hoyer – Majority Leader and Congressman, U.S. House of Representatives
- Lamont Jordan – University of Maryland and NFL football player
- Andrew Maynard – professional boxer and Olympian
- Ray Miller – MLB manager and pitching coach
- Nick Nelson – University of Wisconsin and NFL football player
- Russ Ramsey – American executive, financier, and philanthropist
- J. August Richards – American actor, Angel, Agents of S.H.I.E.L.D.
- Chad Scott – NFL football player
- Devin Tyler – Temple University and NFL football player
- Eric Underwood – American British dancer, model, and actor
- Jude Waddy – NFL football player
