= Walker Mill, Maryland =

- Census-designated place
- Location of Walker Mill, Maryland
- Coordinates: 38°52′15″N 76°53′29″W
- Country: United States
- State: Maryland
- County: Prince George's

Area
  - Total: 3.02 sq mi (7.81 km^{2})
  - Land: 3.02 sq mi (7.81 km^{2})
  - Water: 0 sq mi (0.00 km^{2})
- Elevation: 203 ft (62 m)

Population (2020)
  - Total: 12,187
  - Density: 4,040.1/sq mi (1,559.89/km^{2})
- Time zone: UTC−5 (Eastern (EST))
  - Summer (DST): UTC−4 (EDT)
- FIPS code: 24-81250
- GNIS feature ID: 1867304

Walker Mill is an unincorporated area and census-designated place (CDP) in Prince George's County, Maryland, United States. Per the 2020 census, the population was 12,187.

== Geography ==
Walker Mill is located at 38°52′15″N 76°53′29″W.

According to the United States Census Bureau, the CDP has a total area of 3.2 square miles (8.3 km^{2}), all land.

== Demographics ==
Historical population
Census	Pop.	Note	%±
1970	6,322		—
1980	10,651		68.5%
1990	10,920		2.5%
2000	11,104		1.7%
2010	11,302		1.8%
2020	12,187		7.8%
U.S. Decennial Census; 2010 2020

=== Racial and ethnic composition ===
Walker Mill CDP, Maryland – Racial and ethnic composition Note: the US Census treats Hispanic/Latino as an ethnic category. This table excludes Latinos from the racial categories and assigns them to a separate category. Hispanics/Latinos may be of any race.
Race / Ethnicity (NH = Non-Hispanic)	Pop 2000	Pop 2010	Pop 2020	% 2000	% 2010	% 2020
White alone (NH)	255	129	237	2.30%	1.14%	1.94%
Black or African American alone (NH)	10,508	10,626	10,737	94.63%	94.02%	88.10%
Native American or Alaska Native alone (NH)	38	46	35	0.34%	0.41%	0.29%
Asian alone (NH)	28	42	57	0.25%	0.37%	0.47%
Native Hawaiian or Pacific Islander alone (NH)	1	2	6	0.01%	0.02%	0.05%
Other race alone (NH)	11	5	46	0.10%	0.04%	0.38%
Mixed race or Multiracial (NH)	163	168	326	1.47%	1.49%	2.67%
Hispanic or Latino (any race)	100	284	743	0.90%	2.51%	6.10%
Total	11,104	11,302	12,187	100.00%	100.00%	100.00%

=== 2020 census ===
As of the 2020 census, Walker Mill had a population of 12,187. The median age was 38.6 years. 21.9% of residents were under the age of 18 and 17.1% were 65 years of age or older. For every 100 females there were 78.8 males, and for every 100 females age 18 and over there were 73.0 males age 18 and over.

100.0% of residents lived in urban areas, while 0.0% lived in rural areas.

There were 4,843 households in Walker Mill, of which 28.6% had children under the age of 18 living in them. Of all households, 25.1% were married-couple households, 19.8% were households with a male householder and no spouse or partner present, and 49.5% were households with a female householder and no spouse or partner present. About 33.5% of all households were made up of individuals and 13.3% had someone living alone who was 65 years of age or older.

There were 5,035 housing units, of which 3.8% were vacant. The homeowner vacancy rate was 1.5% and the rental vacancy rate was 4.0%.

=== 2000 census ===
As of the census of 2000, there were 11,104 people, 3,976 households, and 2,985 families residing in the CDP. The population density was 3,523.2 inhabitants per square mile (1,360.3/km^{2}). There were 4,219 housing units at an average density of 1,338.7 per square mile (516.9/km^{2}). The racial makeup of the CDP was 2.47% White, 94.99% African American, 0.37% Native American, 0.26% Asian, 0.01% Pacific Islander, 0.23% from other races, and 1.68% from two or more races. Hispanic or Latino of any race were 0.90% of the population.

There were 3,976 households, out of which 37.9% had children under the age of 18 living with them, 34.4% were married couples living together, 34.7% had a female householder with no husband present, and 24.9% were non-families. 20.7% of all households were made up of individuals, and 3.4% had someone living alone who was 65 years of age or older. The average household size was 2.78 and the average family size was 3.18.

In the CDP, the population was spread out, with 30.9% under the age of 18, 9.0% from 18 to 24, 29.6% from 25 to 44, 23.2% from 45 to 64, and 7.3% who were 65 years of age or older. The median age was 32 years. For every 100 females, there were 80.3 males. For every 100 females aged 18 and over, there were 70.5 males.

The median income for a household in the CDP was $49,276, and the median income for a family was $51,052. Males had a median income of $35,473 versus $31,281 for females. The per capita income for the CDP was $19,340. About 8.8% of families and 11.5% of the population were below the poverty line, including 16.7% of those under age 18 and 8.3% of those age 65 or over.

== Education ==
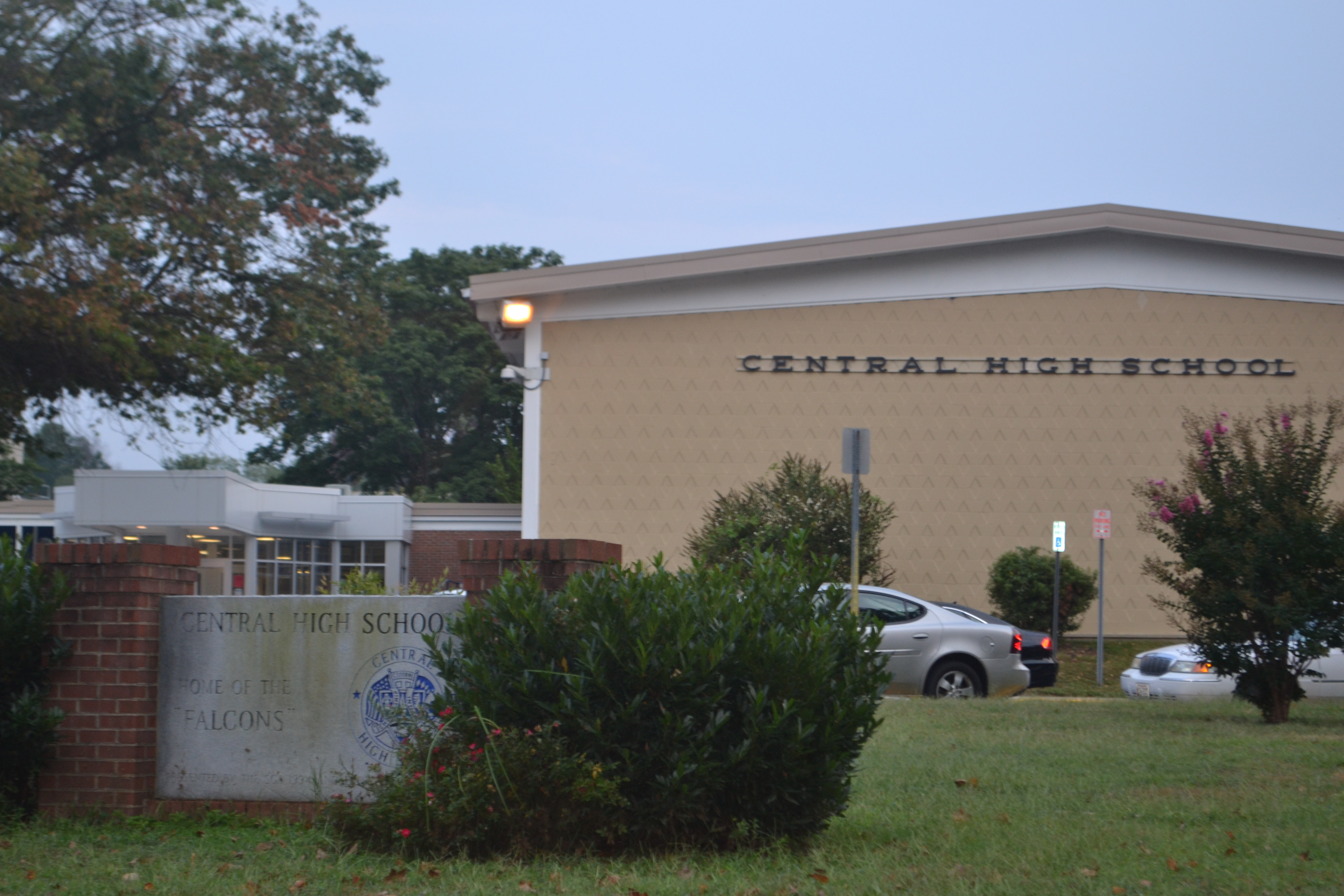
Central High School

Walker Mill is a part of the Prince George's County Public Schools system.

Zoned elementary schools for the CDP are John Bayne, Doswell Brooks, Concord, and District Heights. Walker Mill Middle School serves most of Walker Mill CDP while Drew-Freeman Middle serves a section. Much of the CDP is zoned to Central High School while a portion is zoned to Suitland High School.

Thomas Claggett Elementary School was previously in Walker Mill CDP. Its official capacity was 464. In 2005 it had 236 students, filling 49% of the official capacity; this was the lowest percentage of any PGCPS school. At one point the capacity percentage was 38%. In 2010 it had 290 students, but after that year the student count declined: it had 216, and later 223 in the 2013–2014 school year, and the projected 2014-2015 enrollment was 187. In addition, in state tests circa 2014, about 56% of the students were proficient in reading while 36.7% were proficient in mathematics. In May 2014 PGCPS applied for a grant from the state of Maryland that would permit it to close Claggett.
