= Queensland, Maryland =

- Census-designated place
- Location within the state of Maryland Queensland, Maryland (the United States)
- Coordinates: 38°48′18″N 76°47′28″W
- Country: United States
- State: Maryland
- County: Prince George's

Area
  - Total: 4.74 sq mi (12.27 km^{2})
  - Land: 4.73 sq mi (12.25 km^{2})
  - Water: 0.0077 sq mi (0.02 km^{2})
- Elevation: 120 ft (37 m)

Population (2020)
  - Total: 2,191
  - Density: 463.2/sq mi (178.86/km^{2})
- Time zone: UTC−5 (Eastern (EST))
  - Summer (DST): UTC−4 (EDT)
- Area codes: 301, 240
- FIPS code: 24-64568

Queensland is a census-designated place south of Upper Marlboro, Maryland, United States. The population of the CDP was 2,191 at the 2020 census. It was formerly known as Queenland until 2014 when it was renamed as Queensland and a small portion of its geography was transferred to Upper Marlboro.

== Geography ==
According to the U.S. Census Bureau as of 2010, Queenland has a total area of 4.9 square miles (12.6 km^{2}), of which 0.012 square miles (0.03 km^{2}), or 0.26%, is water.

The CDP is bordered to the north by Maryland Route 4, to the south and east by U.S. Route 301, and to the west by Marlboro Pike and South Osborne Road. The CDPs of Westphalia, Marlboro Village, and Brock Hall border Queensland to the north, Croom is to the southeast, Marlton is to the south, and Rosaryville is to the southwest.

== Demographics ==
Historical population
| Census | Pop. | Note | %± |
|---|---|---|---|
| 2010 | 1,929 | | — |
| 2020 | 2,191 | | 13.6% |
U.S. Decennial Census; 2010 2020 The CDP was known as Queenland at the 2010 Census

Queensland first appeared as a census designated place in the 2010 U.S. census under the name Queenland formed out of part of the deleted Greater Upper Marlboro CDP; it was renamed as Queensland for the 2020 U.S. census.

=== Racial and ethnic composition ===
Queensland CDP, Maryland – Racial and ethnic composition Note: the US Census treats Hispanic/Latino as an ethnic category. This table excludes Latinos from the racial categories and assigns them to a separate category. Hispanics/Latinos may be of any race.
| Race / Ethnicity (NH = Non-Hispanic) | Pop 2010 | Pop 2020 | % 2010 | % 2020 |
|---|---|---|---|---|
| White alone (NH) | 338 | 296 | 17.52% | 13.51% |
| Black or African American alone (NH) | 1,483 | 1,593 | 76.88% | 72.71% |
| Native American or Alaska Native alone (NH) | 9 | 13 | 0.47% | 0.59% |
| Asian alone (NH) | 14 | 27 | 0.73% | 1.23% |
| Native Hawaiian or Pacific Islander alone (NH) | 5 | 0 | 0.26% | 0.00% |
| Other race alone (NH) | 0 | 22 | 0.00% | 1.00% |
| Mixed race or Multiracial (NH) | 42 | 95 | 2.18% | 4.34% |
| Hispanic or Latino (any race) | 38 | 145 | 1.97% | 6.62% |
| Total | 1,929 | 2,191 | 100.00% | 100.00% |

=== 2020 census ===
As of the 2020 census, Queensland had a population of 2,191. The median age was 44.0 years. 20.1% of residents were under the age of 18 and 17.2% of residents were 65 years of age or older. For every 100 females there were 86.6 males, and for every 100 females age 18 and over there were 88.7 males age 18 and over.

72.3% of residents lived in urban areas, while 27.7% lived in rural areas.

There were 728 households in Queensland, of which 33.0% had children under the age of 18 living in them. Of all households, 62.6% were married-couple households, 12.5% were households with a male householder and no spouse or partner present, and 20.2% were households with a female householder and no spouse or partner present. About 14.8% of all households were made up of individuals and 4.9% had someone living alone who was 65 years of age or older.

There were 747 housing units, of which 2.5% were vacant. The homeowner vacancy rate was 1.4% and the rental vacancy rate was 0.0%.

== Education ==
Prince George's County Public Schools operates public schools serving the census-designated place. Most of the CDP is zoned to Marlton Elementary School, with a section instead zoned to Melwood Elementary School.

Residents are zoned to James Madison Middle School, and Dr. Henry A Wise, Jr. High School.
