= Westphalia, Maryland =

- Census-designated place
- Location within the state of Maryland Westphalia, Maryland (the United States)
- Coordinates: 38°50′24″N 76°49′26″W
- Country: United States
- State: Maryland
- County: Prince George's

Area
  - Total: 9.92 sq mi (25.68 km^{2})
  - Land: 9.91 sq mi (25.66 km^{2})
  - Water: 0.0077 sq mi (0.02 km^{2})
- Elevation: 180 ft (55 m)

Population (2020)
  - Total: 11,770
  - Density: 1,188.1/sq mi (458.71/km^{2})
- Time zone: UTC−5 (Eastern (EST))
  - Summer (DST): UTC−4 (EDT)
- Area codes: 301, 240
- FIPS code: 24-83290

Westphalia is a census-designated place in southern Prince George's County, Maryland, United States. The population of the CDP was 11,770 at the 2020 census.

== History ==
The U.S. Census Bureau first defined the Westphalia census-designated place for the 2010 U.S. census. In the 2020 U.S. census, portions of Westphalia were given to the new Brown Station CDP.

== Geography ==
According to the U.S. Census Bureau, Westphalia has a total area of 13.3 square miles (34.4 km^{2}), of which 0.03 square miles (0.07 km^{2}), or 0.20%, is water. The CDP is bordered to the west by the Capital Beltway (I-495/95) and to the south by Maryland Route 4. The CDP of Largo borders Westphalia to the north, Brock Hall is to the northeast, Marlboro Village is to the east, Queensland, Rosaryville and Melwood are to the south, Andrews Air Force Base is to the southwest, and Forestville is to the west.

== Demographics ==
Historical population
Census	Pop.	Note	%±
2010	7,266		—
2020	11,770		62.0%
U.S. Decennial Census; 2010 2020

Westphalia first appeared as a census designated place in the 2010 U.S. census.

=== Racial and ethnic composition ===
Westphalia CDP, Maryland – Racial and ethnic composition Note: the US Census treats Hispanic/Latino as an ethnic category. This table excludes Latinos from the racial categories and assigns them to a separate category. Hispanics/Latinos may be of any race.
Race / Ethnicity (NH = Non-Hispanic)	Pop 2010	Pop 2020	% 2010	% 2020
White alone (NH)	713	568	9.81%	4.83%
Black or African American alone (NH)	6,011	9,265	82.73%	78.72%
Native American or Alaska Native alone (NH)	23	26	0.32%	0.22%
Asian alone (NH)	72	198	0.99%	1.68%
Native Hawaiian or Pacific Islander alone (NH)	0	3	0.00%	0.03%
Other race alone (NH)	14	71	0.19%	0.60%
Mixed race or Multiracial (NH)	172	452	2.37%	3.84%
Hispanic or Latino (any race)	261	1,187	3.59%	10.08%
Total	7,266	11,770	100.00%	100.00%

=== 2020 census ===
As of the 2020 census, Westphalia had a population of 11,770. The median age was 38.0 years. 22.1% of residents were under the age of 18 and 10.0% were 65 years of age or older. For every 100 females, there were 84.1 males, and for every 100 females age 18 and over, there were 80.5 males.

92.5% of residents lived in urban areas, while 7.5% lived in rural areas.

There were 4,451 households, of which 33.9% had children under the age of 18 living in them. Of all households, 42.3% were married-couple households, 16.3% were households with a male householder and no spouse or partner present, and 35.5% were households with a female householder and no spouse or partner present. About 26.5% of all households were made up of individuals, and 5.6% had someone living alone who was 65 years of age or older.

There were 4,651 housing units, of which 4.3% were vacant. The homeowner vacancy rate was 1.4%, and the rental vacancy rate was 3.2%.

== Planning issues ==
On February 6, 2007, the Prince George's County Council approved the Westphalia Sector Plan and Sectional Map Amendment. This document established a planning concept for the Westphalia area and rezoned specified properties. This concept is envisions a "high-density, transit- and pedestrian-oriented urban town center" surrounded by three village centers and multiple residential modules. Buildout is proposed to include 14,000 - 15,300 new residential units, 4.5 million square feet of commercial space, and 750,000 square feet of retail space. A 150-acre Central Park is proposed immediately north of the Town Center, approximately at the center of the Westphalia area.

== Education ==
Prince George's County Public Schools operates public schools serving the census-designated place.

School zoning as of 2024 (with the 2020 Census map being used, and compare with the 2010 Census map):

Elementary schools:

- Arrowhead Elementary School - Within the Westphalia CDP as of the 2020 U.S. Census
- Barack Obama Elementary School - Obama Elementary opened on August 23, 2010.
- Melwood Elementary School

Middle schools:

- Kettering Middle School
- James Madison Middle School

High schools:

- Dr. Henry A Wise, Jr. High School
- Largo High School

Obama, and Wise, in the 2010 U.S. census, were in the Westphalia CDP. However, in the 2020 Census, they were moved to the Brown Station CDP.
