= Upper Marlboro =

Upper Marlboro may refer to a community in the United States:

- Upper Marlboro, Maryland, a town
- Greater Upper Marlboro, Maryland, a mailing address and former census-designated place surrounding the incorporated town
