= Marlboro Meadows, Maryland =

Marlboro Meadows
- Census-designated place
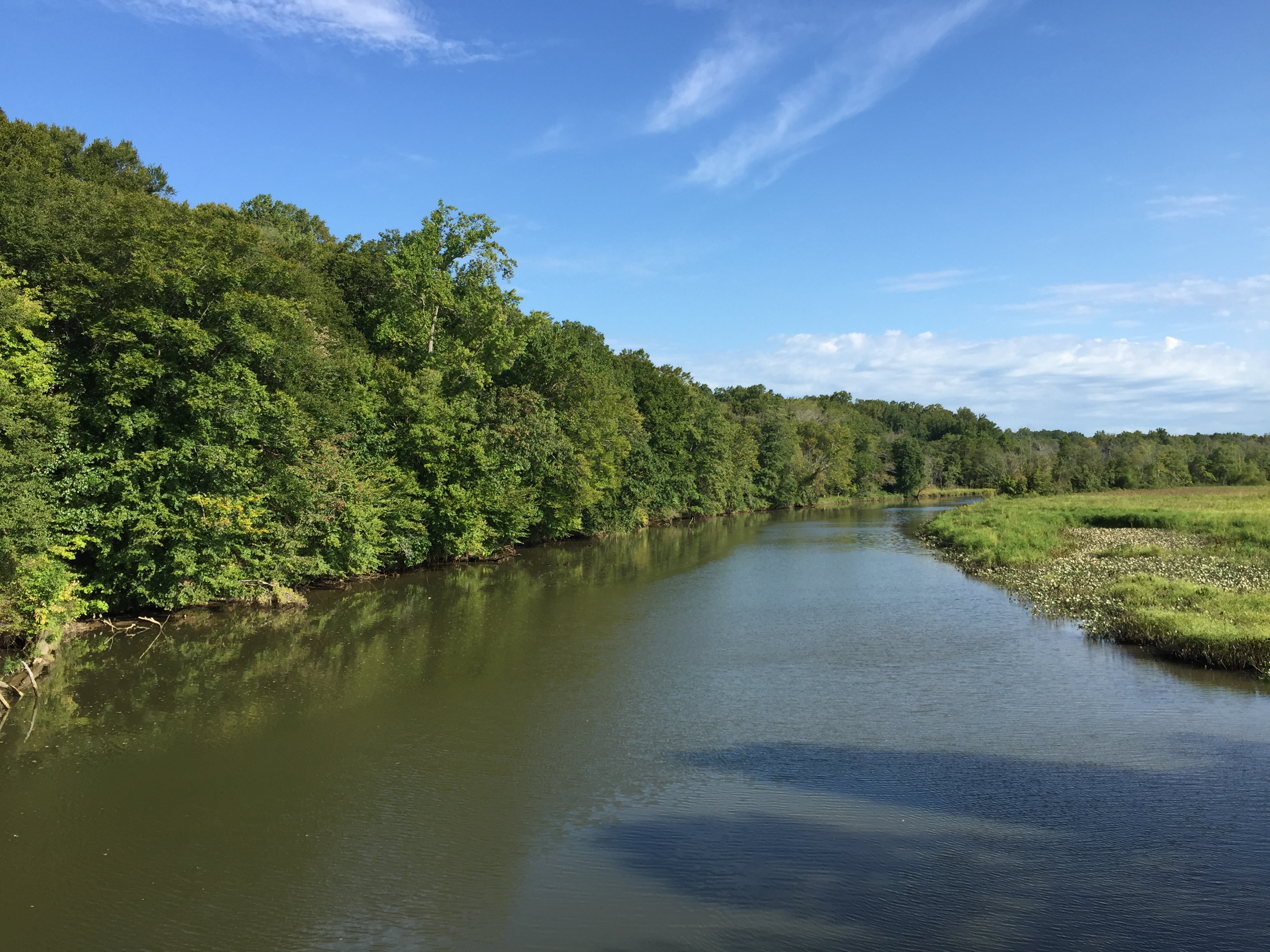
- The Patuxent River forms the eastern boundary of Marlboro Meadows

- Location within the state of Maryland Marlboro Meadows (the United States)
- Coordinates: 38°50′10″N 76°42′54″W
- Country: United States
- State: Maryland
- County: Prince George's

Area
  - Total: 6.18 sq mi (16.00 km^{2})
  - Land: 6.10 sq mi (15.79 km^{2})
  - Water: 0.081 sq mi (0.21 km^{2})

Population (2020)
  - Total: 3,655
  - Density: 599.6/sq mi (231.49/km^{2})
- Time zone: UTC−5 (Eastern (EST))
  - Summer (DST): UTC−4 (EDT)
- FIPS code: 24-50680
- GNIS feature ID: 1714749

Marlboro Meadows is an unincorporated community and census-designated place (CDP) in Prince George's County, Maryland, United States. Per the 2020 census, the population was 3,655. It was newly delineated for the 2010 census prior to which the area was part of the Greater Upper Marlboro census-designated place.

== Geography ==
According to the U.S. Census Bureau, Marlboro Meadows has a total area of 6.2 square miles (16.0 km^{2}), of which 6.1 square miles (15.8 km^{2}) is land and 0.08 square miles (0.2 km^{2}), or 1.34%, is water.

== Demographics ==
Historical population
Census	Pop.	Note	%±
2010	3,672		—
2020	3,655		−0.5%
U.S. Decennial Census; 2010 2020

Marlboro Meadows first appeared as a census designated place in the 2010 U.S. census formed from part of the deleted Greater Upper Marlboro CDP.

=== Racial and ethnic composition ===
Marlboro Meadows CDP, Maryland – Racial and ethnic composition Note: the US Census treats Hispanic/Latino as an ethnic category. This table excludes Latinos from the racial categories and assigns them to a separate category. Hispanics/Latinos may be of any race.
Race / Ethnicity (NH = Non-Hispanic)	Pop 2010	Pop 2020	% 2010	% 2020
White alone (NH)	336	276	9.15%	7.55%
Black or African American alone (NH)	3,112	2,880	84.75%	78.80%
Native American or Alaska Native alone (NH)	5	16	0.14%	0.44%
Asian alone (NH)	38	32	1.03%	0.88%
Native Hawaiian or Pacific Islander alone (NH)	3	5	0.08%	0.14%
Other race alone (NH)	4	19	0.11%	0.52%
Mixed race or Multiracial (NH)	64	116	1.74%	3.17%
Hispanic or Latino (any race)	110	311	3.00%	8.51%
Total	3,672	3,655	100.00%	100.00%

=== 2020 census ===
As of the 2020 census, Marlboro Meadows had a population of 3,655. The median age was 41.8 years. 19.8% of residents were under the age of 18 and 17.3% of residents were 65 years of age or older. For every 100 females there were 85.3 males, and for every 100 females age 18 and over there were 80.6 males age 18 and over.

93.2% of residents lived in urban areas, while 6.8% lived in rural areas.

There were 1,265 households in Marlboro Meadows, of which 33.0% had children under the age of 18 living in them. Of all households, 44.6% were married-couple households, 14.9% were households with a male householder and no spouse or partner present, and 36.5% were households with a female householder and no spouse or partner present. About 19.9% of all households were made up of individuals and 7.7% had someone living alone who was 65 years of age or older.

There were 1,308 housing units, of which 3.3% were vacant. The homeowner vacancy rate was 1.3% and the rental vacancy rate was 2.3%.

== Education ==
Prince George's County Public Schools operates public schools serving the census-designated place. The zoned schools are Patuxent Elementary School, Kettering Middle School, and Dr. Henry A Wise, Jr. High School.
