= Greater Upper Marlboro, Maryland =

- Unincorporated area
- Coordinates: 38°49′39″N 76°45′4″W
- Country: United States
- State: Maryland
- County: Prince George's
- Abolished: 2010

Area
  - Total: 37.5 sq mi (97.1 km^{2})
  - Land: 37.2 sq mi (96.4 km^{2})
  - Water: 0.27 sq mi (0.7 km^{2})

Population (2000)
  - Total: 18,720
  - Density: 503/sq mi (194.2/km^{2})
- Time zone: UTC−5 (Eastern (EST))
  - Summer (DST): UTC−4 (EDT)
- FIPS code: 24-34712

Greater Upper Marlboro is an area of Prince George's County, Maryland, United States, that completely surrounds Upper Marlboro, the county seat. It was formerly a census-designated place (CDP), with a population of 18,720 at the 2000 census. However, the 2010 census divided the area into several smaller CDPs, including portions of Marlboro Meadows, Brock Hall, Marlboro Village, Queenland, and Croom.

== Geography ==
Greater Upper Marlboro is located at 38°49′39″N 76°45′04″W.

According to the U.S. Census Bureau, Greater Upper Marlboro (red area on this map) had a total area of 37.5 square miles (97 km^{2}), of which 37.2 square miles (96 km^{2}) was land and 0.3 square miles (0.78 km^{2}), or 0.75%, was water. The local zip code mailing address of "Greater Upper Marlboro", however, covers 77 square miles (200 km^{2}) of territory and includes additional areas west and south of the red area, extending from the Capital Beltway (Largo, Westphalia, and New Orchard areas) on the west to the Patuxent River/county line on the east, and far southward into the rural Croom and Nottingham, Naylor, and Rosaryville areas (greatly below the map's red area).

== Education ==
Residents of the former census-designated place are zoned to schools in the Prince George's County Public Schools district.

Elementary schools serving the former CDP:

- Arrowhead
- Marlton
- Mattaponi
- Melwood
- Barack Obama
- Patuxent
- Perrywood
- Pointer Ridge

Residents of the former CDP are zoned to the following middle schools: Kettering, James Madison, Gwynn Park, and Benjamin Tasker. Residents of the former CDP are zoned to the following high schools: Frederick Douglass, Largo, Dr. Henry A. Wise, Jr., and Bowie.

The very large Prince George's Community College campus is in Largo, at the northern end of the area, and has an Upper Marlboro mailing address.

== Housing ==
Numerous local planned suburban developments have gradually blossomed throughout the community, starting in the 1960s, with large, new homes still continuing to go up. These communities include Kettering, Marlton, Brock Hall, Marlboro Meadows, Melwood Park, and others.

== Religious institutions ==
There are several megachurches, such as Evangel Cathedral, the First Baptist of Glenarden, and the Ark of Safety Christian Church.

St. Barnabas Church, one of the oldest churches in Maryland, is located here, along with St. Mary's of the Assumption Roman Catholic Church. First Baptist Church of Upper Marlboro (established 1959), Greater St. John Baptist Church (established in DC in 1963) and Cornerstone Peaceful Baptist Church, formed in 1987 as a merger of the Cornerstone Baptist and Peaceful Baptist Churches, are also located in Greater Upper Marlboro.

Several churches in the area run private schools: Riverdale Baptist School, Excellence Christian School, Divine Peace Lutheran, and Life Church Ministries.

== Demographics ==
Historical population
Census	Pop.	Note	%±
1990	11,528		—
2000	18,720		62.4%

Greater Upper Marlboro CDP, Maryland – Racial and ethnic composition Note: the US Census treats Hispanic/Latino as an ethnic category. This table excludes Latinos from the racial categories and assigns them to a separate category. Hispanics/Latinos may be of any race.
Race / Ethnicity (NH = Non-Hispanic)	Pop 2000	% 2000
White alone (NH)	3,766	20.12%
Black or African American alone (NH)	14,020	74.89%
Native American or Alaska Native alone (NH)	56	0.30%
Asian alone (NH)	226	1.21%
Native Hawaiian or Pacific Islander alone (NH)	7	0.04%
Other race alone (NH)	23	0.12%
Mixed race or Multiracial (NH)	284	1.52%
Hispanic or Latino (any race)	338	1.81%
Total	18,720	100.00%

As of the census of 2000, there were 18,720 people, 6,514 households, and 4,572 families residing in the CDP. The population density was 503.0 inhabitants per square mile (194.2/km^{2}). There were 6,812 housing units at an average density of 183.0 per square mile (70.7/km^{2}). The racial makeup of the CDP was 75.50% African American, 20.60% White, 0.31% Native American, 1.23% Asian, 0.04% Pacific Islander, 0.67% from other races, and 1.65% from two or more races. Hispanic or Latino of any race were 1.81% of the population.

There were 6,514 households, out of which 37.5% had children under the age of 18 living with them, 50.7% were married couples living together, 15.2% had a female householder with no husband present, and 29.8% were non-families. 24.6% of all households were made up of individuals, and 3.3% had someone living alone who was 65 years of age or older. The average household size was 2.68 and the average family size was 3.22.

In the CDP, the population was spread out, with 26.2% under the age of 18, 7.6% from 18 to 24, 39.5% from 25 to 44, 21.4% from 45 to 64, and 5.4% who were 65 years of age or older. The median age was 34 years. For every 100 females, there were 99.6 males. For every 100 females age 18 and over, there were 98.0 males.

The median income for a household in the CDP was $73,005, and the median income for a family was $81,666 (these figures had risen to $90,762 and $101,706 respectively as of a 2007 estimate). Males had a median income of $47,857 versus $41,100 for females. The per capita income for the CDP was $29,218. About 2.0% of families and 3.4% of the population were below the poverty line, including 4.4% of those under age 18 and 7.0% of those age 65 or over. In 2007, Money Magazine named Greater Upper Marlboro as one of the best places to live in the United States.

== Notable people ==
Besides those residents from Upper Marlboro, Maryland, famous residents also include the following:

- Joshua Cribbs, NFL player for the Cleveland Browns
- Markelle Fultz, NBA player with the Orlando Magic
- Shawne Merriman, NFL linebacker for the Buffalo Bills
- Victor Oladipo, NBA player with the Indiana Pacers
- Garry Shider (1953–2010), guitar player for the P-Funk All-Stars
- Nolan Smith, NBA player for the Portland Trail Blazers
- Mattie Stepanek, young poet and celebrity
- Chase Young, American football defensive end
