= Forestville, Maryland =

- CDP
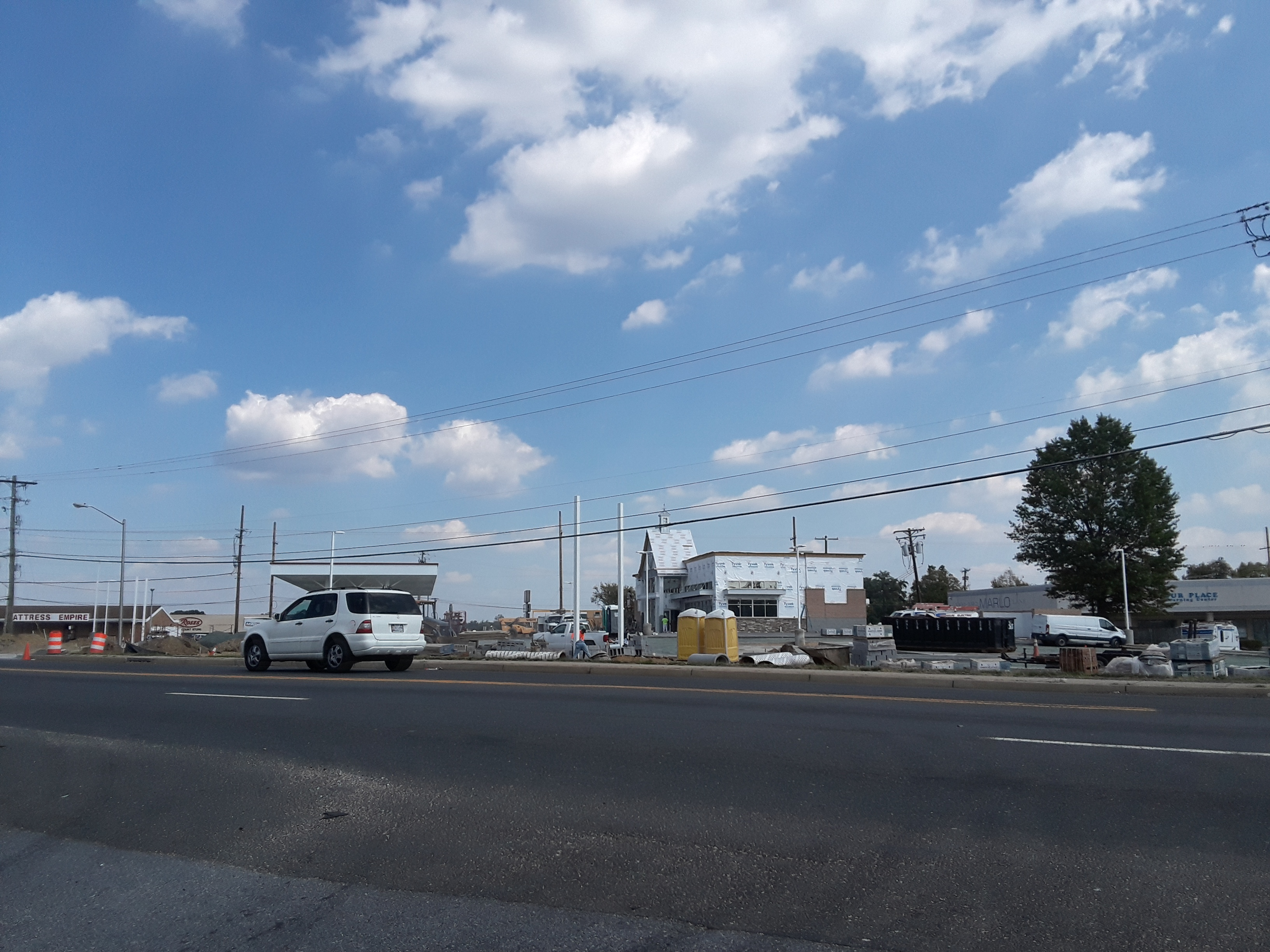
- A Royal Farms gas station being constructed along Marlboro Pike in Forestville

- Location of Forestville, Maryland
- Coordinates: 38°51′18″N 76°52′31″W
- Country: United States
- State: Maryland
- County: Prince George's

Area
  - Total: 3.93 sq mi (10.17 km^{2})
  - Land: 3.93 sq mi (10.17 km^{2})
  - Water: 0 sq mi (0.00 km^{2})
- Elevation: 279 ft (85 m)

Population (2020)
  - Total: 12,831
  - Density: 3,267.2/sq mi (1,261.46/km^{2})
- Time zone: UTC−5 (Eastern (EST))
  - Summer (DST): UTC−4 (EDT)
- ZIP codes: 20747, 20753
- Area codes: 301, 240
- FIPS code: 24-29000
- GNIS feature ID: 0597413

Forestville is an unincorporated area and census-designated place (CDP) in Prince George's County, Maryland, United States. Per the 2020 census, the population was 12,831. The community is a mixture of garden apartments, single-family homes, and shopping centers built mostly from the 1930s through 1970s, adjacent to the communities of District Heights, Suitland, Morningside, Westphalia and Camp Springs.

Forestville is located close to the town of Upper Marlboro, where many Prince George's County Board Offices are located. Additionally, Forestville is located adjacent to the Joint Base Andrews/ Andrews Air Force Base. The neighborhood has a majority African-American population. It is convenient to the Capital Beltway (I-95/I-495) and Maryland Route 4 for many, including employees of Andrews Air Force Base and the U.S. Census Bureau. Forestville is located within proximity to the Suitland Metro Station, served by WMATA's Green Line. A notable former resident was Steny Hoyer, now Democratic Leader of the United States House of Representatives.

== History ==
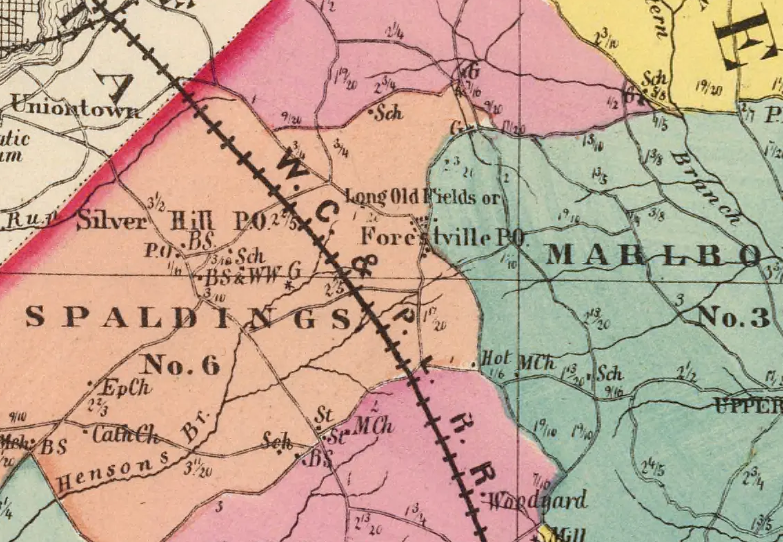
A map of Forestville in 1873.

Forestville was originally known as Long Old Fields. During the War of 1812, Long Old Fields served as an encampment on August 23, 1814, for American forces opposing the invading British, who camped just a few miles away. These forces met at the Battle of Bladensburg the next day. Long Old Fields' name was changed to Forestville sometime after the end of the Civil War in 1865.

== Geography ==
Forestville is located at 38°51′18″N 76°52′31″W. According to the United States Census Bureau, the CDP has a total area of 4.0 square miles (10 km^{2}), all land.

== Demographics ==
Historical population
Census	Pop.	Note	%±
2000	12,707		—
2010	12,353		−2.8%
2020	12,831		3.9%
U.S. Decennial Census; 2010 2020

=== Racial and ethnic composition ===
Forestville CDP, Maryland – Racial and ethnic composition Note: the US Census treats Hispanic/Latino as an ethnic category. This table excludes Latinos from the racial categories and assigns them to a separate category. Hispanics/Latinos may be of any race.
Race / Ethnicity (NH = Non-Hispanic)	Pop 2000	Pop 2010	Pop 2020	% 2000	% 2010	% 2020
White alone (NH)	1,322	577	397	10.40%	4.67%	3.09%
Black or African American alone (NH)	10,845	10,746	10,370	85.35%	86.99%	80.82%
Native American or Alaska Native alone (NH)	37	27	23	0.29%	0.22%	0.18%
Asian alone (NH)	116	85	131	0.91%	0.69%	1.02%
Native Hawaiian or Pacific Islander alone (NH)	7	5	1	0.06%	0.04%	0.01%
Other race alone (NH)	13	17	73	0.10%	0.14%	0.57%
Mixed race or Multiracial (NH)	200	193	339	1.57%	1.56%	2.64%
Hispanic or Latino (any race)	167	703	1,497	1.31%	5.69%	11.67%
Total	12,707	12,353	12,831	100.00%	100.00%	100.00%

=== 2020 census ===
As of the 2020 census, Forestville had a population of 12,831. The median age was 40.0 years. 20.6% of residents were under the age of 18 and 15.5% of residents were 65 years of age or older. For every 100 females there were 86.7 males, and for every 100 females age 18 and over there were 83.3 males age 18 and over.

100.0% of residents lived in urban areas, while 0.0% lived in rural areas.

There were 4,856 households in Forestville, of which 30.3% had children under the age of 18 living in them. Of all households, 28.1% were married-couple households, 21.6% were households with a male householder and no spouse or partner present, and 44.2% were households with a female householder and no spouse or partner present. About 29.7% of all households were made up of individuals and 9.9% had someone living alone who was 65 years of age or older.

There were 5,091 housing units, of which 4.6% were vacant. The homeowner vacancy rate was 1.5% and the rental vacancy rate was 4.7%.

=== 2000 census ===
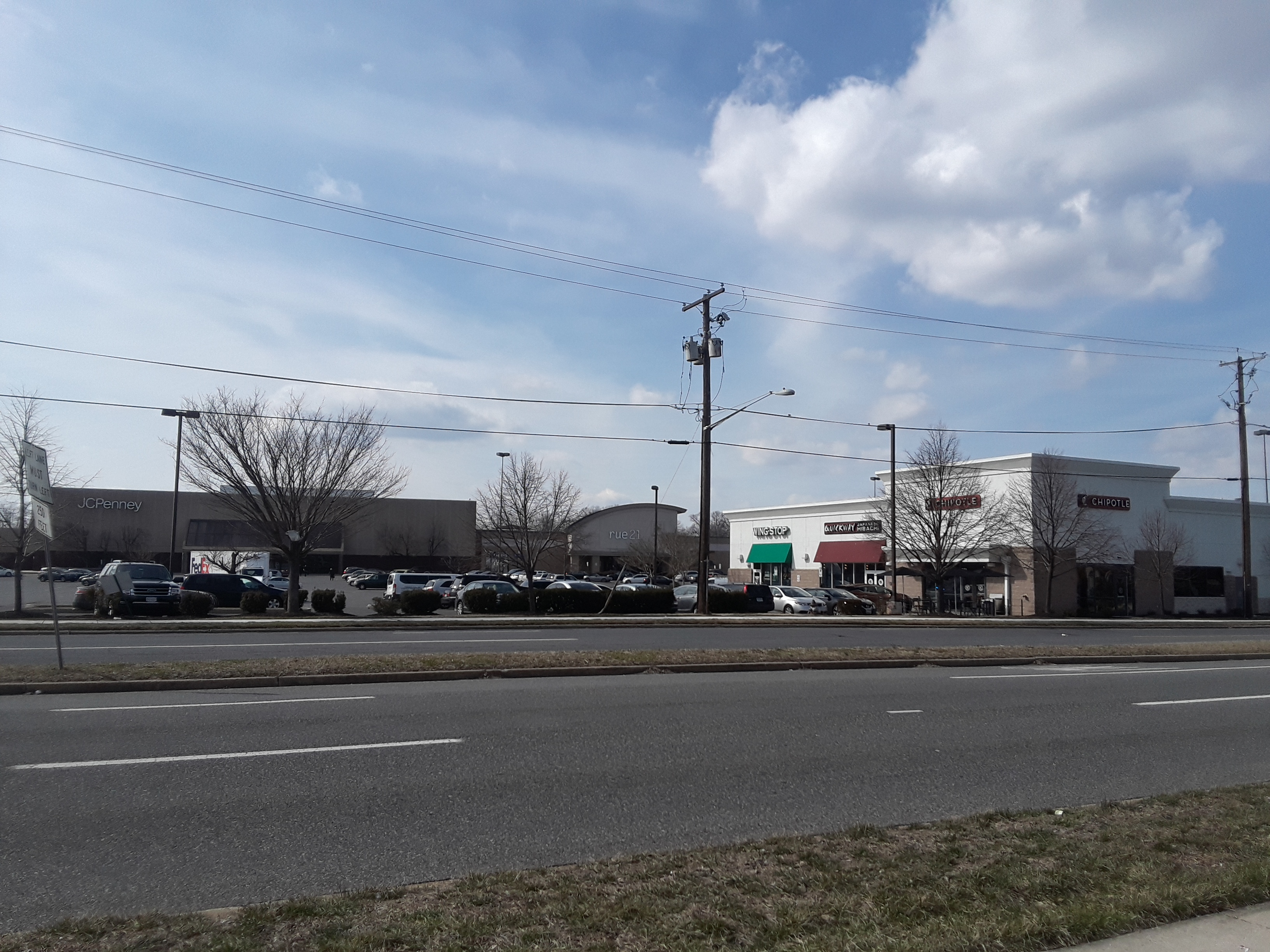
Penn Mar Shopping Center in Forestville

As of the census of 2000, there were 12,707 people, 4,642 households, and 3,267 families residing in the CDP. The population density was 3,169.5 inhabitants per square mile (1,223.8/km^{2}). There were 4,951 housing units at an average density of 1,234.9 per square mile (476.8/km^{2}). The racial makeup of the CDP was 10.54% White, 85.78% African American, 0.29% Native American, 0.92% Asian, 0.06% Pacific Islander, 0.61% from other races, and 1.81% from two or more races. Hispanic or Latino of any race were 1.31% of the population.

There were 4,642 households, out of which 36.1% had children under the age of 18 living with them, 38.2% were married couples living together, 26.7% had a female householder with no husband present, and 29.6% were non-families. 24.7% of all households were made up of individuals, and 4.8% had someone living alone who was 65 years of age or older. The average household size was 2.71 and the average family size was 3.22. In the CDP, the population was spread out, with 28.2% under the age of 18, 7.7% from 18 to 24, 32.2% from 25 to 44, 23.7% from 45 to 64, and 8.2% who were 65 years of age or older. The median age was 35 years. For every 100 females, there were 83.5 males. For every 100 females age 18 and over, there were 78.0 males. The median income for a household in the CDP was $51,831, and the median income for a family was $57,096. Males had a median income of $37,739 versus $34,796 for females. The per capita income for the CDP was $22,205. About 4.7% of families and 5.8% of the population were below the poverty line, including 6.7% of those under age 18 and 5.8% of those age 65 or over.

== Government ==
Prince George's County Police Department District 3 Station in Landover CDP serves the community.

== Education ==
Forestville is served by the county-wide public school system, Prince George's County Public Schools.

Elementary schools serving sections of the CDP include Andrew Jackson, William Beanes, Longfields, North Forestville, and John Bayne. Sections of Forestville CDP are zoned to Andrew Jackson, Drew-Freeman, and Walker Mill middle schools. Sections of Forestville CDP are zoned to Dr. Henry A. Wise Jr. High School, Suitland High School, and Largo High School. Forestville High School (a.k.a. Forestville Military Academy) was previously in the CDP until its 2016 closure.

Bishop McNamara High School is in Forestville CDP. Mount Calvary Catholic School was previously adjacent to Forestville CDP; in April 2016 the Roman Catholic Archdiocese of Washington announced Mount Calvary would close.

== Notable people ==
- Nick Charles - Maryland State Delegate, Legislative District 25
- Tray Chaney - actor
- Kevin Dorsey - former NFL wide receiver for Green Bay Packers and New England Patriots
- NaVorro Bowman - NFL linebacker
- Ginuwine - singer
- Steny Hoyer - Democratic Congressman and House Majority leader who resided in Forrestville in the 1980s.
- LaMont Jordan - former NFL running back.
- Jeff Kinney - game designer and author of Diary of a Wimpy Kid, grew up here
- Kellie Shanygne Williams - actress
- Goonew - American rapper
