= Dr. Henry A. Wise Jr. High School =

High school in Maryland, US

Location
- 12650 Brooke Lane, Upper Marlboro, Maryland postal address 20772; United States; 38°49′59″N 76°47′16″W

Information
- School type: Public, high school
- Founded: 2006
- School district: Prince George's County Public Schools
- NCES District ID: 2400510
- NCES School ID: 240051001542
- Principal: Taryn Washington
- Staff: 128 (on an FTE basis)
- Grades: 9–12
- Enrollment: 2,208 (2021–2022)
- Student to teacher ratio: 17.25
- Campus: Suburban
- Colors: Blue and Yellow
- Nickname: Pumas
- Website: www.pgcps.org/drhenrywisejr/

Dr. Henry A. Wise Jr. High School is a public high school in unincorporated Prince George's County, Maryland, United States, with an Upper Marlboro postal address. A part of the Prince George's County Public Schools (PGCPS), it opened in the fall of 2006.

As of the 2020 U.S. census, the school is located in the Brown Station census-designated place. During the 2010 U.S. census, the school was located in the Westphalia CDP. When it opened in 2006, it was not in any CDP established by the 2000 U.S. census.

== About ==
Its namesake was Henry A. Wise Jr., the first African-American doctor admitted to practice at Prince George's Hospital and a Tuskegee Airman. Taryn Washington is the principal in 2023.

In 2022, Dr. Henry A. Wise Jr. High School had a 98.1% minority enrollment, the majority of students are Black. In 2022, some 48% of students were economically disadvantaged.

== History ==
The total amount of money spent to build the school was $91.8 million, including $6.9 million for the gymnasium. During the design process, PGCPS Chief of Schools Andre J. Hornsby successfully campaigned for the school district to add $6.5 million to the funding for the gym even though some of the members of the PG County Council believed that existing campuses should get the money for refurbishments.

The school was scheduled to open in fall 2006, with 112 teachers and 1,900 students in grades 9–11. Monica Goldson was the schools first principal.

From circa 2011 to 2014, the percentage of 9th grade students held back in grade declined by 15%. In 2014 the Steve Harvey Neighborhood Awards gave Wise High the best high school award; the award winner is determined by a vote among a group of people.

As of 2024, Dr. Henry A. Wise Jr. High School offers four Career and Technical Educational programs (CTE) in Business and Finance, Health and Bioscience, Information Technology, and Child Growth and Development.

=== Safety issues ===
In 2021, a family sued Prince George's County Schools over their handling of an alleged campus sexual assault between a developmentally disabled 14-year-old girl and six boys. The sexual assault was filmed and shared on social media, further causing trauma.

In January 2023, a Wise High teacher 'inadvertently' sent sexually explicit photos to students, and action was taken by the administration to retract the message.

In May 2025, two 10th grade students were arrested for bringing a loaded Draco Pistol into the school. One student was seen handing a black backpack to another student, only clear backpacks were allowed at the school. Security stopped to check the students bag, and that's when the firearm was found. The Prince George's County Police Department issued arrest warrants for both students. Both students were found, and charged as adults.

== Campus ==
The school is on Brooke Lane, between Brown Station Road and Ritchie Marlboro Road, in the Westphalia census-designated place in unincorporated Prince George's County, Maryland, with an Upper Marlboro postal address.

The campus had a cost of $92 million; the 55-acre (22 ha) campus includes a main building with 432,579 square feet (40,187.9 m^{2}) of space. The school has three computer laboratories, three lecture halls, and a greenhouse. Nick Anderson of The Washington Post wrote that many of the aspects of the design of Wise's campus were similar to that of Charles H. Flowers High School; he wrote that Wise's campus "far surpasses the other 21 major high school campuses in the county" and that only the Flowers main building "comes close to the quality of" the Wise high main building.

The school also has the largest gymnasium of any non-university school in the Baltimore–Washington metropolitan area. The gymnasium has a capacity of 5,000 seats, making it the largest of any PGCPS school; the gym's second floor has a running track. The attached parking lot has 525 spaces as of 2012. In 2012 The Washington Post reported that area community members complained that the parking lot was too small for use for major events; there was a desire to have the Wise gymnasium used for such events so the county government would not have to rent venues of similar sizes, and therefore spend less money. The students also have an auxiliary gym as well as rooms for cardio fitness, aerobics, weights, and dance; the dance room has mirrors.

The fine and performing arts facilities include a black box theater, a performing arts center with 950 seats, and a room for vocal music; Nick Anderson of The Washington Post stated that the acoustic system in the performing arts center is "similar to the Music Center at Strathmore in North Bethesda."

== Communities served ==
The school serves: much of Westphalia CDP, the towns of Upper Marlboro and Morningside, a section of the city of District Heights, the CDPs of Marlboro Meadows, Marlboro Village, Melwood, and Queensland, and portions of the Brock Hall, Camp Springs, Clinton, Croom, Forestville, Kettering, and Rosaryville CDPs. In addition it serves the base housing of Joint Base Andrews/Andrews Air Force Base and the associated Andrews AFB CDP. It serves sections of the former Greater Upper Marlboro CDP.

== Notable alumni ==
- Ryan Smith (2011), former American football cornerback
- Zach Pascal (2012), American football wide receiver for the New York Giants
- Marcus Allen (2014), former American football safety
- Khyree Jackson (2017), American football cornerback
- Isaac Ukwu (2017), American football defensive end for the Detroit Lions
- Dorian Strong (2020), American football cornerback for the Buffalo Bills
- Jalil Farooq (2021), American college football wide receiver for the Maryland Terrapins
- 3ohBlack(2009), Rapper/Artist who signed partnership with Capitol Records in 2019
