= Largo High School (Maryland) =

Public school in Maryland, US

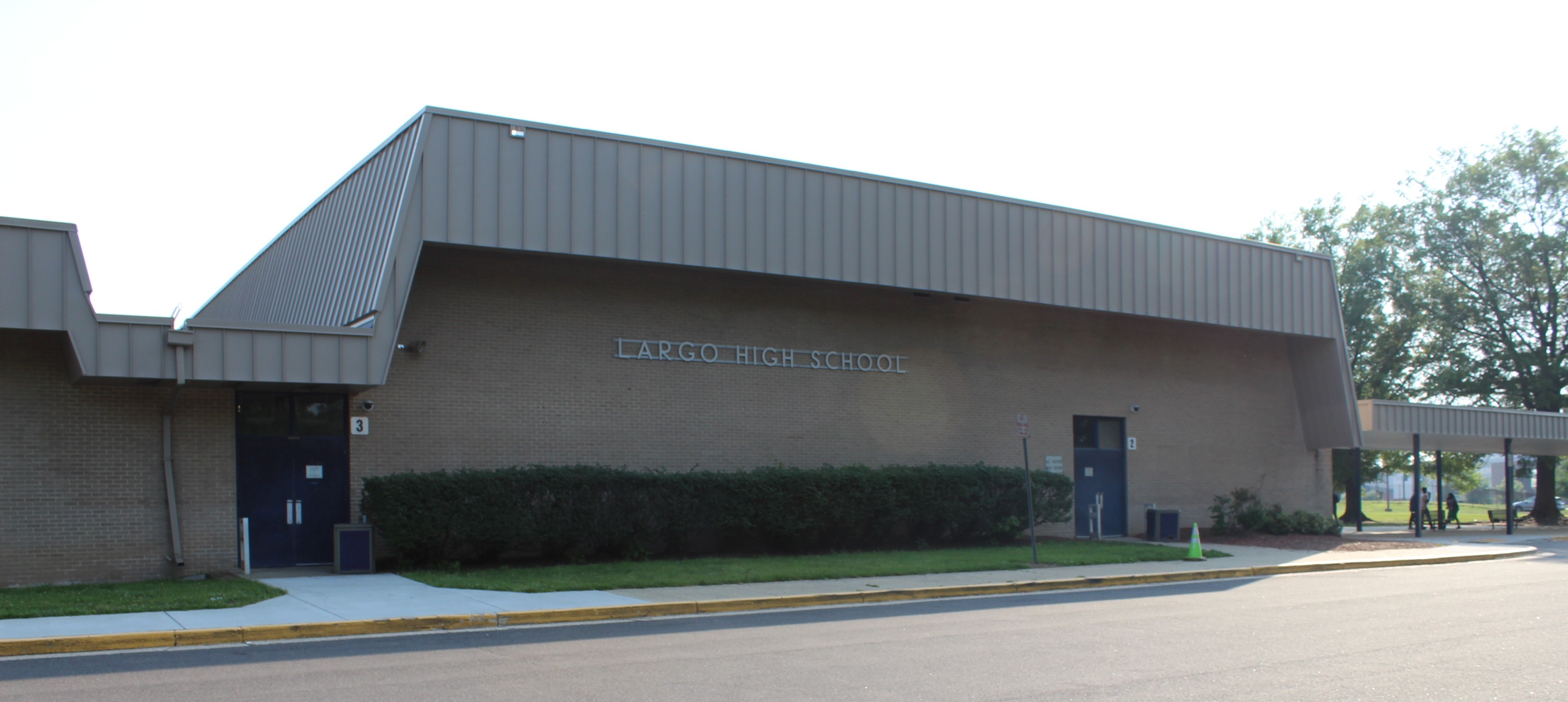
- Largo High School entrance facing Maryland Route 202

Location
- 505 Largo Road; Largo, Maryland 20774; United States
- Coordinates: 38°53′12″N 76°49′12″W

Information
- School type: Public, High School
- School board: 2A
- School district: Prince George's County Public School System
- CEEB code: 211051
- Principal: Albert T. Lewis
- Staff: 104
- Grades: 9 to 12
- Gender: coed
- Enrollment: 1,102
- Colors: blue and silver
- Mascot: Lion
- Communities served: Largo, Ardmore, Kettering, and pockets of Woodmore
- Website: www.pgcps.org/largo/

Largo High School is a public High School in Largo census-designated place, Prince George's County, Maryland, United States. Operated by Prince George's County Public Schools, it serves students of grades 9 to 12.

The school is operated by the Prince George's County Public Schools system. The school's athletic teams are known as the Lions. The school serves about 870 students in grades 9 through 12. The principal is Albert T. Lewis. The school's name originates from the Largo unincorporated community, which is served by the school. Other places served include sections of the CDPs of Kettering, Brock Hall, Forestville, and Westphalia. It serves sections of the former Greater Upper Marlboro CDP.

Largo High School is located next to Prince George's Community College.

== History ==
In August 1994, there was an active shooting at Largo High School. The perpetrator was 17 year old Warren E. Graham.

In August 2014, former English teacher Jon Everhart won a $350,000 jury award after accusing the school system of discriminating against him because he is Caucasian. It was alleged in his lawsuit against the school board that former principal Angelique Simpson-Marcus forced him out of his job because of his race and faced years of racial harassment from her. Everhart sued in 2010 after he was fired and was one of several employees who made allegations of harassment.

== Athletics ==
- Swimming
- Football
- Soccer (boys and girls)
- Lacrosse
- Baseball
- Softball
- Volleyball
- Track & Field
- Cross Country
- Basketball
- Cheerleading
- Tennis
- BAND

== Notable people ==
- Aisha Braveboy – Current Prince George's County Executive, former Prince George's County States Attorney and former Maryland State Delegate
- Steve Byrnes – former NASCAR TV analyst
- Kevin Glover – NFL player for the Detroit Lions and Seattle Seahawks (1985–1999)
- Usama Young – NFL player for the Cleveland Browns and Oakland Raiders
- Javicia Leslie - actress
