= Marlboro Village, Maryland =

Marlboro Village
- Census-designated place
- Location within the state of Maryland Marlboro Village (the United States)
- Coordinates: 38°49′50″N 76°46′11″W
- Country: United States
- State: Maryland
- County: Prince George's

Area
  - Total: 3.88 sq mi (10.05 km^{2})
  - Land: 3.84 sq mi (9.94 km^{2})
  - Water: 0.042 sq mi (0.11 km^{2})

Population (2020)
  - Total: 9,221
  - Density: 2,401.7/sq mi (927.29/km^{2})
- Time zone: UTC−5 (Eastern (EST))
  - Summer (DST): UTC−4 (EDT)
- FIPS code: 24-50685

Marlboro Village is an unincorporated community and census-designated place (CDP) in Prince George's County, Maryland, United States. Per the 2020 census, the population was 9,221.

== History ==
It was newly delineated for the 2010 U.S. census, prior to which the area was part of the Greater Upper Marlboro census-designated place.

== Geography ==
According to the U.S. Census Bureau, Marlboro Village has a total area of 3.9 square miles (10.1 km^{2}), of which 3.9 square miles (10.0 km^{2}) is land and 0.04 square miles (0.1 km^{2}), or 1.09%, is water.

== Demographics ==
Historical population
Census	Pop.	Note	%±
2010	9,438		—
2020	9,221		−2.3%
U.S. Decennial Census; 2010 2020

Marlboro Village first appeared as a census designated place in the 2010 U.S. census formed from part of deleted Greater Upper Marlboro CDP.

=== Racial and ethnic composition ===
Marlboro Village CDP, Maryland – Racial and ethnic composition Note: the US Census treats Hispanic/Latino as an ethnic category. This table excludes Latinos from the racial categories and assigns them to a separate category. Hispanics/Latinos may be of any race.
Race / Ethnicity (NH = Non-Hispanic)	Pop 2010	Pop 2020	% 2010	% 2020
White alone (NH)	598	377	6.34%	4.09%
Black or African American alone (NH)	8,175	8,031	86.62%	87.09%
Native American or Alaska Native alone (NH)	29	20	0.31%	0.22%
Asian alone (NH)	84	87	0.89%	0.94%
Native Hawaiian or Pacific Islander alone (NH)	3	5	0.03%	0.05%
Other race alone (NH)	5	23	0.05%	0.25%
Mixed race or Multiracial (NH)	178	318	1.89%	3.45%
Hispanic or Latino (any race)	366	360	3.88%	3.90%
Total	9,438	9,221	100.00%	100.00%

=== 2020 census ===
As of the 2020 census, Marlboro Village had a population of 9,221. The median age was 38.1 years. 19.3% of residents were under the age of 18 and 8.3% were 65 years of age or older. For every 100 females there were 89.7 males, and for every 100 females age 18 and over there were 86.0 males age 18 and over.

99.8% of residents lived in urban areas, while 0.2% lived in rural areas.

There were 3,649 households in Marlboro Village, of which 29.9% had children under the age of 18 living in them. Of all households, 29.7% were married-couple households, 17.5% were households with a male householder and no spouse or partner present, and 47.1% were households with a female householder and no spouse or partner present. About 34.9% of all households were made up of individuals and 5.8% had someone living alone who was 65 years of age or older.

There were 3,819 housing units, of which 4.5% were vacant. The homeowner vacancy rate was 1.7% and the rental vacancy rate was 6.8%.

== Government and infrastructure ==
Marlboro Village houses the Prince George's County Correctional Center.

== Education ==
Prince George's County Public Schools operates public schools serving the census-designated place. Barack Obama and Perrywood elementary schools serve sections of the CDP. James Madison and Kettering middle schools serve sections of the CDP. The zoned high school is Dr. Henry A Wise, Jr. High School.
