= Brock Hall, Maryland =

Brock Hall
- Census-designated place
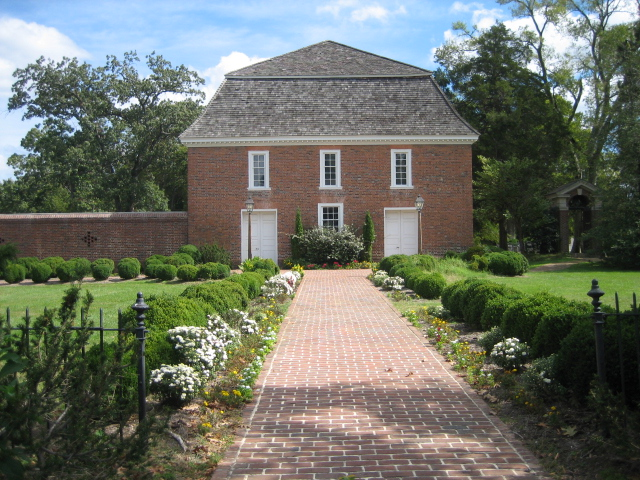
- St. Barnabas' Episcopal Church, Leeland

- Location within the state of Maryland Brock Hall (the United States)
- Coordinates: 38°50′54″N 76°45′52″W
- Country: United States
- State: Maryland
- County: Prince George's

Area
  - Total: 10.03 sq mi (25.98 km^{2})
  - Land: 9.95 sq mi (25.78 km^{2})
  - Water: 0.077 sq mi (0.20 km^{2})

Population (2020)
  - Total: 13,181
  - Density: 1,324.2/sq mi (511.28/km^{2})
- Time zone: UTC−5 (Eastern (EST))
  - Summer (DST): UTC−4 (EDT)
- Area codes: 301, 240
- FIPS code: 24-10150
- GNIS feature ID: 597135

Brock Hall is an unincorporated area and census-designated place in eastern Prince George's County, Maryland, United States, located south of Largo and Bowie, and north of Upper Marlboro. As of the 2020 census, the CDP had a population of 13,181.

== History ==
Brock Hall CDP was created for the 2010 U.S. census; previously it was defined as being a part of Greater Upper Marlboro CDP.

In the 2020 U.S. census, a portion of Brock Hall was re-defined by the U.S. Census Bureau as being part of the new Brown Station CDP.

== Geography ==
Brock Hall is located in eastern Prince George's County, approximately 11 miles (18 km) east of the boundary of the District of Columbia and 2 miles (3 km) north of Upper Marlboro. U.S. Route 301 forms the eastern boundary of the community.

As of the 2010 census, the CDP had a total area of 13.7 square miles (35.6 km^{2}), of which 13.6 square miles (35.3 km^{2}) was land and 0.12 square miles (0.3 km^{2}), or 0.98%, was water.

== Demographics ==
Historical population
| Census | Pop. | Note | %± |
|---|---|---|---|
| 2010 | 9,552 | | — |
| 2020 | 13,181 | | 38.0% |
U.S. Decennial Census; 2010 2020

Brock Hall first appeared as a census designated place in the 2010 U.S. census formed out of part of deleted Greater Upper Marlboro CDP and additional area.

=== Racial and ethnic composition ===
Brock Hall CDP, Maryland – Racial and ethnic composition Note: the US Census treats Hispanic/Latino as an ethnic category. This table excludes Latinos from the racial categories and assigns them to a separate category. Hispanics/Latinos may be of any race.
| Race / Ethnicity (NH = Non-Hispanic) | Pop 2010 | Pop 2020 | % 2010 | % 2020 |
|---|---|---|---|---|
| White alone (NH) | 509 | 511 | 5.33% | 3.88% |
| Black or African American alone (NH) | 8,428 | 11,440 | 88.23% | 86.79% |
| Native American or Alaska Native alone (NH) | 20 | 9 | 0.21% | 0.07% |
| Asian alone (NH) | 183 | 221 | 1.92% | 1.68% |
| Native Hawaiian or Pacific Islander alone (NH) | 2 | 7 | 0.02% | 0.05% |
| Other race alone (NH) | 25 | 61 | 0.26% | 0.46% |
| Mixed race or Multiracial (NH) | 193 | 459 | 2.02% | 3.48% |
| Hispanic or Latino (any race) | 192 | 473 | 2.01% | 3.59% |
| Total | 9,552 | 13,181 | 100.00% | 100.00% |

=== 2020 census ===
As of the 2020 census, Brock Hall had a population of 13,181. The median age was 40.5 years. 23.9% of residents were under the age of 18 and 9.7% of residents were 65 years of age or older. For every 100 females there were 86.7 males, and for every 100 females age 18 and over there were 82.6 males age 18 and over.

99.8% of residents lived in urban areas, while 0.2% lived in rural areas.

There were 4,399 households in Brock Hall, of which 40.6% had children under the age of 18 living in them. Of all households, 55.3% were married-couple households, 12.0% were households with a male householder and no spouse or partner present, and 28.4% were households with a female householder and no spouse or partner present. About 18.2% of all households were made up of individuals and 3.4% had someone living alone who was 65 years of age or older.

There were 4,484 housing units, of which 1.9% were vacant. The homeowner vacancy rate was 0.9% and the rental vacancy rate was 2.3%.

== Government and infrastructure ==
Prince George's County Police Department District 2 Station is in Brock Hall and has a Bowie postal address.

== Education ==
Prince George's County Public Schools operates public schools serving the census-designated place.

Elementary schools serving sections of the CDP (as defined by the 2010 U.S. Census) are Arrowhead, Barack Obama, Patuxent, and Pointer Ridge. Most of the CDP is zoned to Kettering Middle School, with portions zoned instead to Benjamin Tasker and James Madison middle schools. The CDP is served by Dr. Henry A Wise, Jr. High School, Largo High School, and Bowie High School.

The CDP also houses Imagine Foundations at Leeland Charter School. The 54-acre (22 ha) campus, which had seven buildings as of 2011, built for the defunct Queen Anne School.

Queen Anne School was established in 1964 by St. Barnabas' Episcopal Church, Leeland. It had 11 students in its first year and 30 students the following year. Eventually it had almost 300 students, but at one point its enrollment declined. By 2011 the school had only 94 students left and the administration announced it was closing. The charter school announced that year that it was moving into the campus

== Culture ==
St. Barnabas' Episcopal Church, Leeland is in Brock Hall.
