= Prince George's County Public Schools =

Public school district in Prince George's County, Maryland, United States

Location
- Sasscer Administration Building; 14201 School Lane; Upper Marlboro, Maryland 20772 Prince George's County, Maryland United States
- Coordinates: 38°48′54″N 76°45′32″W

District information
- Type: Public
- Motto: Great by Choice
- Grades: Pre-K through 12
- Established: 1899
- Superintendent: Dr. Shawn Joseph
- Deputy superintendent(s): Dr. Carletta T. Marrow, High Schools; Dr. David G. Curry, Jr., Middle Schools; Dr. Kasandra G. Lassiter, Elementary Schools
- Schools: 201
- Budget: $2.3 billion (2022)
- NCES District ID: 2400510

Students and staff
- Students: 131,146 (2022–23)
- Teachers: 9,274 (2021–22)
- Staff: 17,389 (2021–22)
- Student–teacher ratio: 13.89 (2021–22)

Other information
- Website: www.pgcps.org

Prince George's County Public Schools (PGCPS) is a public school district that serves Prince George's County, Maryland. During the 2024–25 academic year, the district enrolled around 133,000 students and operated over 200 schools. PGCPS is the second-largest school district in Maryland, the third-largest district in the Washington-Baltimore metropolitan area, the 18th-largest in the United States, and the nation's largest school district with a majority-black student population.

Headquartered in Upper Marlboro, PGCPS is the county's sole school district. The Prince George's County Board of Education comprises 14 members who oversee the Superintendent.

On June 13, 2025, Dr. Shawn Joseph was named as interim Superintendent for the district. On June 1, 2026, the appointment of Dr. Joseph to the Superintendent role was made permanent.

== History ==
=== Early years of PGCPS (1899–1974) ===
In 1899, Laurel High was founded as the first high school in Prince George's County. Situated at Montgomery and Eighth Streets in Downtown Laurel, it began with nine teachers and 59 students, with the 1900 graduating class being all women. The school's roof served as a Civil Defense aircraft spotting station during World War II. By 1965, the school relocated to a more expansive campus. The original building, listed on the National Register of Historic Places in 1979, now functions as a community center.

In 1952, the school district permitted black students to attend grades 1–12. Before this, black students in the county were limited to the 11th grade, while only white students could progress to the 12th grade.

PGCPS ran three high schools exclusively for black students before desegregation: Marlboro Colored High (now Frederick Douglass High School) in Upper Marlboro, Lakeland High School in College Park and Fairmont Heights High School.

=== Desegregation (1974–2009) ===
In 1974, Prince George's County became the nation's largest school district mandated to implement a busing plan to address segregation. Despite the county's over 80% white demographic at the time, specific communities near Washington, D.C. had denser black populations. Although school boundaries were based on communities, the NAACP contended they mirrored segregated housing patterns. Consequently, a federal court mandated a school busing plan. A 1974 Gallup poll indicated that 75% of the county opposed forced busing, with just 32% of black respondents in favor.

The court-mandated busing commenced abruptly mid-school year, excluding final-year high school students. This swift transition disturbed regular school activities and affected family life due to altered schedules, transportation challenges, and disrupted extracurriculars.

By 2001, the court concluded that segregation had been sufficiently addressed. The busing order ended, and neighborhood-centric school boundaries were reinstated.

=== School mergers and consolidation (2009–2020) ===
In 2009, the Prince George's County Public Schools Board voted to merge eight under-enrolled schools and bolster its magnet program offerings. This decision was informed by community consultations, public hearings, and over 2,500 survey responses.

Key aspects of the 2009 consolidation:

- Eight schools, including Berkshire, John Carroll, and John E. Howard Elementaries, were permanently closed for the 2009-2010 academic year.
- Five schools, like Andrew Jackson Middle and Samuel P. Massie Elementary, transitioned to K-8 programs.
- Benjamin D. Foulois Elementary was converted into a K-8 Creative & Performing Arts magnet center.
- Concord, Dodge Park, District Heights, and Oakcrest elementary schools remained open despite potential closure considerations.

By 2016, additional school consolidations occurred due to changing student populations, particularly in the southern parts of the county. Conversely, northern regions, including Beltsville and Hyattsville, saw increased enrollment and overcrowding.

=== Data breaches and COVID-19 impact (2020–present) ===
Because of the COVID-19 impact, PGCPS schools went through lockdown after March 13, 2020. The 2020–21 school year was online during the year until April 2021 with hybrid learning. The 2021–22 was virtual for some and in-person for some. Because of COVID-19 cases increasing during late 2021, PGCPS went through online school mode again until January 18, 2022 for in-person students and January 31, 2022 for virtual students to go to in-person school.

On August 14, 2023, PGCPS experienced a data breach which caused all students and staff to be locked out of their accounts. Students had to reset their password during the week of August 28, while staff had to reset it immediately. PGCPS were able to regain control of their systems within 12 hours, and sent a message to every student in the district about the cyber attack.

Starting from the 2023–24 school year, clear backpacks are required for high school students and Non Traditional Program North, South and Middle and optional for middle school students to combat shooting in the district.

== Demographics ==
For the 2024–25 academic year, PGCPS boasts an enrollment of over 132,000 students. In the DC area, only neighboring Montgomery County Public Schools in Maryland and Fairfax County Public Schools in Virginia surpass this number.

Based on September 2024 demographic data, the racial and ethnic composition of PGCPS students is as follows:

Student demographics
Race / Ethnicity	Enrollment (2024)	% (2024)
Black or African American	67,397	51.3%
Hispanic or Latino (any race)	52,608	40.1%
White	5,158	3.9%
Asian	3,600	2.7%
Two or more races	1,765	1.3%
American Indian/Alaska Native	527	0.4%
Native Hawaiian or Other Pacific Islander	270	0.2%
Total	131,325	100.0%

Further, 60.4% of students participate in the federal Free and Reduced Lunch program, 11% are enrolled in special education courses, and over 20% of PGCPS students are English language learners.

== Superintendent/CEO ==
In 2013, a governance reorganization led by then-County Executive Rushern Baker renamed the superintendent position to chief executive officer of PGCPS. Dubbed a 'takeover' of the county's school system, this shift increased the operational control for the CEO while limiting the school board's powers. Dr. Kevin Maxwell was the inaugural CEO of Prince George's County Public Schools, serving until 2018. He was succeeded by Dr. Monica Goldson, who remained in the position through the 2022–23 school year.

After a rigorous 6-month nationwide search, the district shortlisted three candidates. Following an interview with County Executive Angela Alsobrooks, Millard House II, former Superintendent of the Houston Independent School District, was chosen to succeed Dr. Goldson. With House's appointment as Superintendent in June 2023, the district ceased referring to its head as CEO. Dr. Shawn Joseph was appointed interim superintendent for the 2025–2026 school year. On June 1, 2026, the appointment of Dr. Joseph to the Superintendent role was made permanent.

=== List of superintendents ===
- Shawn Joseph (interim 2025–2026; 2026-present)
- Millard House II (2023–2025)
- Monica Goldson, CEO (interim 2018–2019; 2019–2023)
- Kevin M. Maxwell, CEO (2013–2018)
- Alvin Crawley (interim 2012–2013)
- William R. Hite, Jr. (interim 2008–2009; 2009–2012)
- John E. Deasy (2006–2008)
- Howard A. Burnett (interim 2005–2006)
- André J. Hornsby (2003–2005)
- Iris T. Metts (1999–2003)
- Jerome Clark (1995–1999)
- Edward M. Felegy (1991–1995)
- John A. Murphy (1984–1991)
- Edward J. Feeney (1976–1984)
- Carl W. Hassel (1970–1976)
- William S. Schmidt (1951–1970)
- G. Gardner Shugart (1944–1951)
- Nicholas Orem Sr. (1921–1943)
- E.S. Burroughs (1915–1921)
- Frederick Sasscer Jr. (1902–1914)

== Transportation ==
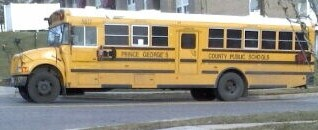
An IC Bus CE-series school bus model, off of Maryland Route 450 in Landover Hills, Maryland

Prince George's County Public Schools operates its bus system, providing student transportation. The fleet comprises various school bus models from Blue Bird Corporation, IC Bus, and Thomas Built Buses, all running on diesel. Accessible buses are available for special-needs children. All buses bear the Prince George's County Public Schools inscription.

With 12 bus lots, the transportation department dispatches over 1,900 drivers and 1,200 buses on more than 5,000 routes. Annually, at least 83,000 students utilize these services. Routes are labeled with three-digit numbers like 615 or a combination of letters and numbers such as B12.

Besides daily commuting, buses also serve school field trips, athletic events, and other sanctioned activities within Maryland and the region. Bus ridership is contingent on the student's distance from school, generally around two miles for intermediate/secondary schools and one and a half miles for primary institutions.

Notably, the district offers students in magnet programs bus service throughout the county, with ridership not contingent on the student's proximity to school.

== List of schools ==
=== High schools ===
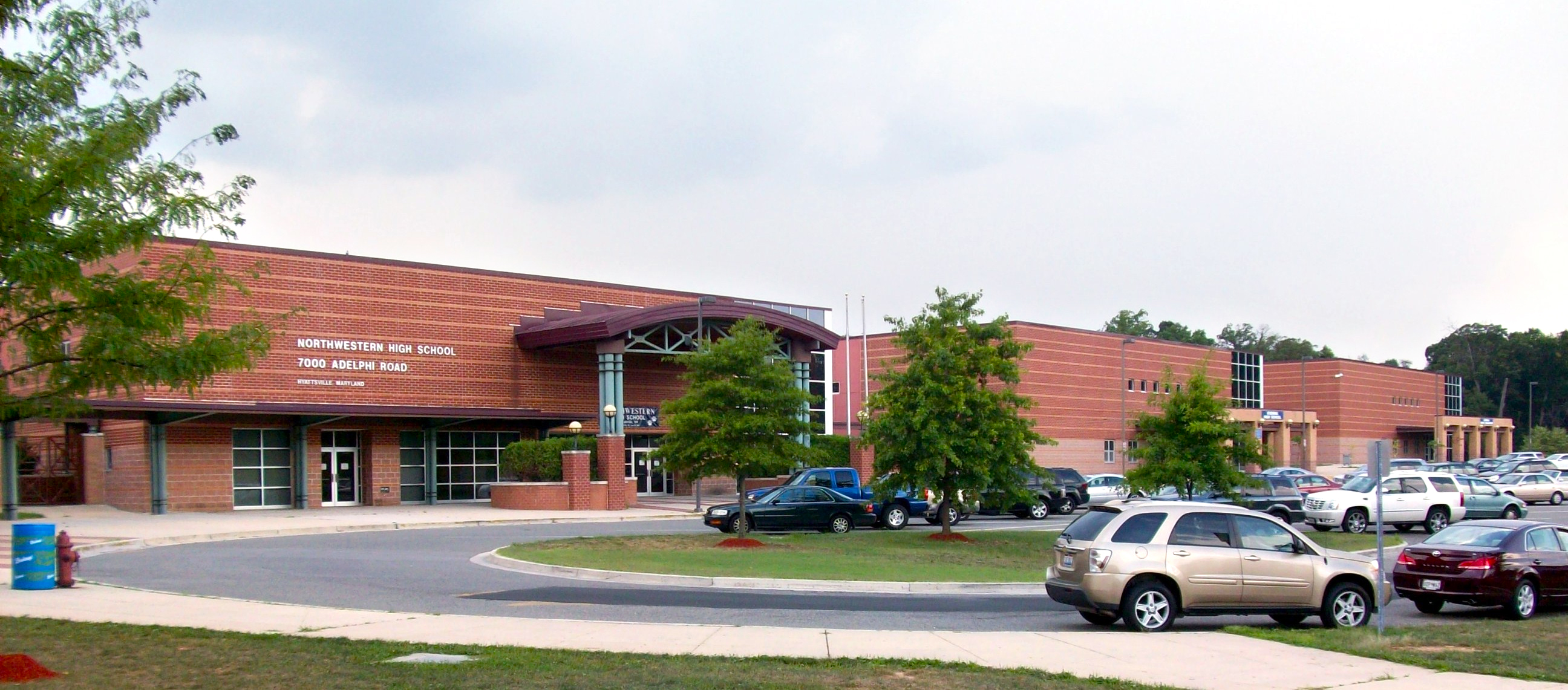
Northwestern High School

All high schools in Prince George's County operate with a "comprehensive" model as their base, with the exception of the Academy of Health Sciences at Prince George's Community College, which is a middle college program. All students are assigned to a high school based on an attendance area.

Magnet Programs operate as a "School-Within-A-School" model, where the magnet serves as an alternative program---in addition to the main comprehensive program---and students from outside the regular attendance area of the high school are enrolled and accepted into the magnet, either through continuity (automatic continuation from a middle school magnet program to the high school level equivalent) or more commonly, through a Magnet Lottery, in which students apply for a magnet program and are granted acceptance through a random drawing. Enrollment into the Center for the Visual and Performing Arts is through audition only.

Several high schools have also implemented a Smaller Learning Community model, where they offer anywhere from two or more Academy Programs, which effectively breaks a school down into several smaller schools within the school, by allowing students to essentially declare a major (such as a student attending a college or university) through career academies such as "Arts, Media, and Communication" or the "National Academy of Finance," for example.

All high schools within PGCPS operate on a staggered school day schedule, where some high schools start as early as 7:45am and end as early as 2:25pm, and other high schools start as late as 9:30am and end as late as 4:10pm. All high schools operate on an alternating A/B-day block scheduling system, where one group of classes are taken on "A-Days" and a different group of classes are taken on "B-Days," and the cycle repeats. Most high schools have between three and four lunch shifts, depending on enrollment and eating accommodations. The only exceptions are Eleanor Roosevelt High School — which has adopted a modified hybrid block schedule in which both traditional single period courses and double period (block schedule) courses are integrated — and the Academy of Health Science at Prince George's Community College.

High schools
School	Website	Location	Opening date (current facility)	Grades	Enrollment (2014–15)	Square footage	Attendance hours (start/end)	Specialized programs
Academy of Health Sciences at Prince George's Community College	Link	Largo	2011	9-12	397 students	N/A	9:30a – 4:10p	Current program(s): Academy of Health Sciences
Academy of Health Sciences at Prince George's Community College	Notes & comments: This high school is run in conjunction with the Prince George's Community College (PGCC) with classes being held on the PGCC campus, and is the State of Maryland's first middle college. The school admitted the first class of 100 freshmen in the fall of 2011. A new grade level was added each year until a full, four-year, grades 9-12 high school became operational.							
Bladensburg High School	Link	Bladensburg	1936	9–12	1,857 students	304,000	9:30a – 4:10p	Current program(s): Biomedical Magnet Program; Career and Technical Education Magnet Program; Academy of Hospitality and Tourism; America's Choice School Design Signature Program Future program(s): Academy of Health and Biosciences; Academy of Graphic Arts, Media and Communications
Bladensburg High School	Notes & comments: Bladensburg received a state-of-the-art replacement facility in August 2004.							
Bowie High School (included with Bowie High School Annex)	Link	Bowie	1965	10–12	2,442 students	280,306	7:30a – 2:10p	Current program(s): SUMMIT Scholar Signature Program Future program(s): Academy of Information Technology; Performing Arts Academy; Academy of Environmental Sciences
Bowie High School (included with Bowie High School Annex)	Notes & comments: Bowie High School has two physical campuses. 10th-12th grade attend classes at the main campus and 9th graders attend classes at the Belair Annex (a former middle school) a half mile away. Bowie was ranked #1,173 on Newsweek's 2010 list of Top 1500 Public High Schools in America. The SUMMIT Scholar Program at Bowie is a four-year course of study through which a select group of students (60-65 students per grade level) follow a comprehensive curriculum combining accelerated honors level and rigorous Advanced Placement course work. The program combines honors, SUMMIT, and Advanced Placement courses, yet remains an integral part of the high school community at Bowie; SUMMIT scholars do not comprise a school within a school.							
Bowie High School Annex (included with Bowie High School)	Link	Bowie	1963	9	N/A	102,351	7:30a – 2:10p	Current program(s): SUMMIT Scholar Signature Program Future program(s): Academy of Information Technology; Performing Arts Academy; Academy of Environmental Sciences
Bowie High School Annex (included with Bowie High School)	Notes & comments: Bowie High School has two physical campuses. 10th-12th grade attend classes at the main campus and 9th graders attend classes at the Belair Annex (a former middle school) a half mile away. Bowie was ranked #1,173 on Newsweek's 2010 list of Top 1500 Public High Schools in America. The SUMMIT Scholar Program at Bowie is a four-year course of study through which a select group of students (60-65 students per grade level) follows a comprehensive curriculum combining accelerated honors level and rigorous Advanced Placement course work. The program combines honors, SUMMIT, and Advanced Placement courses yet remains an integral part of the high school community at Bowie; SUMMIT scholars do not comprise a school within a school.							
Central High School	Link	Walker Mill	1961	9–12	1,004 students	168,366	7:30a – 2:10p	Current program(s): French Immersion Magnet Program; International Baccalaureate (IB) Magnet Program; Law, Education and Public Service Academy; AVID Signature Program; America's Choice School Design Signature Program Future program(s): Global Studies Academy; Academy of Graphic Arts, Media and Communications
Central High School	Notes & comments: Central was ranked #1,429 on Newsweek's Top 1500 Public High Schools in America for 2010. It is an IB World School. Programs they have include Architecture and Design, Global Studies, Graphic Arts, Media and Communications: Health and Biosciences; Consumer Services, Hospitality and Tourism; Law, Education and Public Service; Cosmetology(CAPS); Culinary(CAPS); Electrical(CAPS); Carpentry(CAPS); French Immersion; Nursing(CAPS)							
Crossland High School	Link	Camp Springs	1963	9–12	1,081 students	313,276	7:30a – 2:10p	Current program(s): Technical Academy Magnet Program; International Baccalaureate (IB) Program (non-magnet); Global Studies Academy; America's Choice School Design Signature Program; Crossland Evening High School Future program(s): Academy of Architecture and Design; Academy of Transportation Technologies; Performing Arts Academy
Crossland High School	Notes & comments: Crossland was named an IB World School in 2009.							
Frederick Douglass High School	Link	Upper Marlboro	1965	9–12	940 students	184,417	7:30 – 2:10p	Current program(s): International Baccalaureate (IB) Middle Years Programme; America's Choice School Design Signature Program Future program(s): Academy of Global Studies; Academy of Business and Finance; Academy of Information Technology
Frederick Douglass High School	Notes & comments: Frederick Douglass is an IB World School.							
DuVal High School	Link	Lanham	1960	9–12	1,697 students	281,281	8:30a – 3:10p	Current program(s): Aerospace Engineering and Aviation Technology Program; Project Lead The Way Pre-Engineering Academy; America's Choice School Design Signature Program; Academy of Consumer Services, Hospitality & Tourism; Academy of Humanities, Leadership & Public Service; Academy of Engineering and Science; Academy of Graphic Arts, Media and Communications Future program(s): Academy of Transportation Technologies
DuVal High School	Notes & comments: DuVal received a state-of-the-art, $13.4 million USD, 65,995 sq. ft., 600-student classroom addition in 2007. This added a music wing and two-story academic wing. Starting in 2014, DuVal housed a new specialized Aerospace Engineering and Aviation Technology Program. Admission is based on competitive examination only, and prospective students take the same specialized examination currently used for entrance into the Science and Technology Center. DuVal is currently constructing a new Aerospace building that will be placed next to the Cafeteria.							
Fairmont Heights High School	Link	Chapel Oaks	1950	9–12	788 students	174,128	8:30a – 3:10p	Current program(s): Biotechnology Magnet Program; National Academy of Finance; Information Technology; America's Choice School Design Signature Program Future program(s): Academy of Environmental Studies; Performing Arts Academy
Fairmont Heights High School	Notes & comments: Fairmont Heights is one of three PGCPS high schools which house a special Health and Wellness Center', an on-site medical facility operated under the auspices of the county's Health Department.							
Charles Herbert Flowers High School	Link	Springdale	2001	9–12	2,032 students	332,500	7:30a – 2:10p	Current program(s): Science and Technology Center Magnet Program; Advanced Placement; Business Management; Career and Technical Education; Child Growth and Development; Computer Science; Creative, Visual and Performing Arts; Fire Fighter and Emergency Medical Technician; NAF Finance; Business and Finance; Engineering and Science; ProStart(CAPS); Pre-Engineering - Project Lead the Way; Dance; Community School
Charles Herbert Flowers High School	Notes & comments: Flowers was ranked #1,445 on Newsweek's Top 1500 Public High Schools in America, for 2009.							
Friendly High School	Link	Friendly	1970	9–12	979 students	236,861	7:30a – 2:10p	Current program(s): Academy of Health and Biosciences; America's Choice School Design Signature Program Future program(s): Academy of Engineering and Science; Academy of Information Technology
Friendly High School	Notes & comments: The school has won State Championships in the sports of Basketball in 1998, 2003 and 2004, Football and, in the 1970s, 1980s, 1990s, and in 2006 Indoor and Outdoor track.							
Gwynn Park High School	Link	Brandywine	1956	9–12	1,064 students	194,845	7:45a – 2:25p	Current program(s): Technical Academy Magnet Program; America's Choice School Design Signature Program; Academy of Consumer Services, Hospitality and Tourism; Academy of Environmental Studies; Academy of Information Technology; Future program(s): Academy of Transportation Technologies
Gwynn Park High School	Notes & comments: The school has won state championships in boys basketball in 1968, 1969, 1970, 1972, 1974, 1976, 1980, 1983, 1987, 1988; girls basketball in 1974, 2002, 2003, 2004; baseball in 1984; Boys Outdoor Track and Field 2002 and football in 2005.							
High Point High School	Link	Beltsville	1954	9–12	2,426 students	318,376	7:30a – 2:10p	Current program(s): AVID Signature Program; Academy of Engineering and Science; Child Growth and Development; Curriculum for Agricultural Science Education (CASE), Animal Science and Natural Resources; Academy of Environmental Studies; Academy of Military Science
High Point High School	Notes & comments: High Point received the Siemens Award for Advanced Placement in 2004. High Point was ranked #1,361 on Newsweek's Top 1500 Public High Schools in America, for 2010. U.S. News & World Report named High Point a Silver Medal School in 2010.							
Largo High School	Link	Largo	1970	9–12	1,026 students	243,581	7:30a – 2:10p	Current program(s): Biotechnology Magnet Program; AVID Signature Program; America's Choice School Design Signature Program; Largo Evening High School Future program(s): Academy of Health and Biosciences; Academy of Hospitality and Tourism
Largo High School	Notes & comments: The school is located next to Prince George's Community College.							
Laurel High School	Link	Laurel	1961	9–12	1,814 students	371,531	8:30a – 3:10p	Current program(s): Technical Academy Magnet Program; International Baccalaureate (IB) Program (Non-Magnet); Academy of Global Studies; America's Choice School Design Signature Program Future program(s): Academy of Transportation Technologies; Academy of Information Technology; Academy of Architecture and Design
Laurel High School	Notes & comments: Laurel completed a 600-student classroom addition and a new auditorium in the spring of 2010. Laurel was ranked #1,343 on Newsweek's Top 1500 Public High Schools in America, for 2010. It is an IB World School.							
Northwestern High School	Link	Hyattsville	1951	9–12	2,262 students	386,000	Comprehensive; 9:30a – 4:10p CVPA Magnet; 8:15a – 4:10p	Current program(s): The Jim Henson Center for the Visual and Performing Arts Program; America's Choice School Design Signature Program; School of Business Management and Finance (National Academy of Finance, Academy of Business Management); School of Human Resource Services (The International Studies Academy, NJROTC Academy of Military Science); School of Manufacturing, Engineering and Technology (Project Lead The Way Pre-Engineering Academy); Colours Performing Arts Program; Northwestern Evening High School; Northwestern Adult Evening High School; Northwestern Saturday Academy Future program(s): Academy of Law, Education and Public Service; Performing Arts Academy
Northwestern High School	Notes & comments: Northwestern received a state-of-the-art, $45 million replacement facility, which opened in August 2000. At 386,000sq. ft., it was then the largest high school in the state of Maryland in terms of total square footage. It was surpass in physical size by the new Dr. Henry Wise, Jr. HS (also in Prince George's County), in 2006. Northwestern is the second largest high school in Maryland. U.S. News & World Report named Northwestern a Silver Medal School in 2010. Northwestern became the county's second location for the Center for the Visual and Performing Arts program in the fall of 2013. The program is in-boundary only, and draws students from the Hyattsville Middle School for the Creative and Performing Arts. Entrance into the program is through competitive audition only. Northwestern is one of three PGCPS high schools which house a special Health and Wellness Center, an on-site medical facility operated under the auspices of the county's Health Department.							
Oxon Hill High School	Link	Oxon Hill	1948	9–12	1,456 students	243,048	9:30a – 4:10p	Current program(s): Science and Technology Center Magnet Program; AVID Signature Program; America's Choice School Design Signature Program; Academy of Business and Finance (Academy of Accounting and Finance, Academy of Business Administrative Services, Academy of Business Management); Academy of Engineering; Academy of Graphic Arts and Media; Academy of Consumer Sciences, Hospitality and Tourism (Academy of Hospitality and Restaurant Management); Academy of Military Sciences Future program(s): Academy of Health and Biosciences
Oxon Hill High School	Notes & comments: Oxon Hill was ranked #957 on Newsweek's Top 1500 Public High Schools in America, for 2010. In August 2013, Oxon Hill relocated into a brand new LEED-certified building, that replaced the decades-old former facility. The new school was constructed adjacent to the former building. Oxon Hill is one of three PGCPS high schools which house a special Health and Wellness Center, an on-site medical facility operated under the auspices of the county's Health Department.							
Parkdale High School	Link	Riverdale	1968	9–12	2,148 students	265,201	7:30a – 2:10p	Current program(s): International Baccalaureate (IB) Magnet Program; America's Choice School Design Signature Program; Academy of Global Studies; Capital One Student Banking Program Future program(s): Academy of Architecture and Design; Academy of Law, Education and Public Service; Academy of Military Science
Parkdale High School	Notes & comments: Parkdale received a state-of-the-art, 400-seat classroom addition in November 2007. Parkdale was ranked #1,481 on Newsweek's Top 1500 Public High Schools in America, for 2010. Parkdale is an IB World School.							
Potomac High School	Link	Oxon Hill	1965	9–12	1,145 students	218,083	7:30a – 2:10p	Current program(s): America's Choice School Design Signature Program; National Academy of Finance; School of Arts, Media and Communications (Academy of the Arts-Dance, Academy of the Arts-Music, Academy of the Arts-Visual); School of Business Management and Finance (Academy of Finance, Academy of Business Management); School of Consumer Services, Hospitality and Tourism (Academy of Hospitality and Restaurant Management); School of Human Resource Services (Academy of Homeland Security and Military Science, Academy of Law, Education and Public Service, Teacher Academy of Maryland); School of Manufacturing, Engineering and Technology (Project Lead the Way Pre-Engineering Academy, Information Technology) Future program(s): Academy of Environmental Studies; Academy of Graphic Arts, Media and Communications
Potomac High School	Notes & comments: Potomac received a state-of-the-art, 600-seat classroom addition in January 2008.							
Eleanor Roosevelt High School	Link	Greenbelt	1974	9–12	2,504 students	327,458	8:30a – 3:10p	Current program(s): Science and Technology Center Magnet Program; Capstone Program; Gilder-Lehrman American History Program; National Academy of Finance; Quality Education in Science and Technology (QUEST) Program/Academy of Information Technology (AOIT)
Eleanor Roosevelt High School	Notes & comments: Eleanor Roosevelt has been twice recognized as a National Blue Ribbon School of Excellence, in 1991 and 1998, as well as a Maryland Blue Ribbon School of Excellence in 1991 and 1998. It was named a New American High School in 1999, and it received the Siemens Award for Advanced Placement in 2002. Roosevelt was named a National School of Character in 2002. It was ranked #409 on Newsweek's 2010 list of "Top 1500 Public High Schools in America. U.S. News & World Report named Roosevelt a Silver Medal School in 2008.							
Suitland High School (included with Suitland High School CVPA Annex)	Link	Suitland	1951	9–12	1,806 students	324,046	Comprehensive; 8:40a – 3:25p CVPA Magnet; 8:30a – 4:40p	Current program(s): Center for the Visual and Performing Arts Magnet Program; International Baccalaureate (IB) Magnet Program; Technical Academy Magnet Program (the Jesse J. Warr Vocational Center); America's Choice School Design Signature Program; Navy Junior ROTC (NJROTC) Academy; School of Business and Finance (National Academy of Finance; Academy of Homeland Security and Military Science) Future program(s): Academy of Architecture and Design; Academy of Transportation Technologies
Suitland High School (included with Suitland High School CVPA Annex)	Notes & comments: Suitland High School has two physical campuses: the main campus and the "annex" (a former elementary school) located directly behind the main campus, which houses the majority of the school's Center for the Visual and Performing Arts magnet program. Suitland was named a 1989 National Blue Ribbon School of Excellence and a 1989 Maryland Blue Ribbon School. It is an IB World School.							
Suitland High School CVPA Annex (included with Suitland High School)	Link	Suitland	1963	9-12	N/A	70,933	Comprehensive; 8:30a – 3:10p CVPA Magnet; 8:30a – 4:40p	Current program(s): Center for the Visual and Performing Arts Magnet Program; International Baccalaureate (IB) Magnet Program; Technical Academy Magnet Program (the Jesse J. Warr Vocational Center); America's Choice School Design Signature Program; Navy Junior ROTC (NJROTC) Academy; School of Business and Finance (National Academy of Finance; Academy of Homeland Security and Military Science) Future program(s): Academy of Architecture and Design; Academy of Transportation Technologies
Suitland High School CVPA Annex (included with Suitland High School)	Notes & comments: Suitland High School has two physical campuses: the main campus and the "annex" (a former elementary school) located directly behind the main campus, which houses the majority of the school's Center for the Visual and Performing Arts magnet program. It was named a 1989 National Blue Ribbon School of Excellence.							
Dr. Henry A. Wise, Jr. High School	Link	Upper Marlboro	2006	9–12	2,255 students	434,600	8:30a – 3:10p	Current program(s): Technical Academy Magnet Program; Academy of Health and Biosciences; Academy of Computer Networking Future program(s): Performing Arts Academy
Dr. Henry A. Wise, Jr. High School	Notes & comments: At 434,600 sq. ft. and with a capacity of 2,600 students, Wise is the largest high school in the state of Maryland when measured by total square footage. It was completed in August 2006 and features a 5,000-seat professional gymnasium, the largest of any school in the Washington metropolitan area.							

=== Middle schools ===
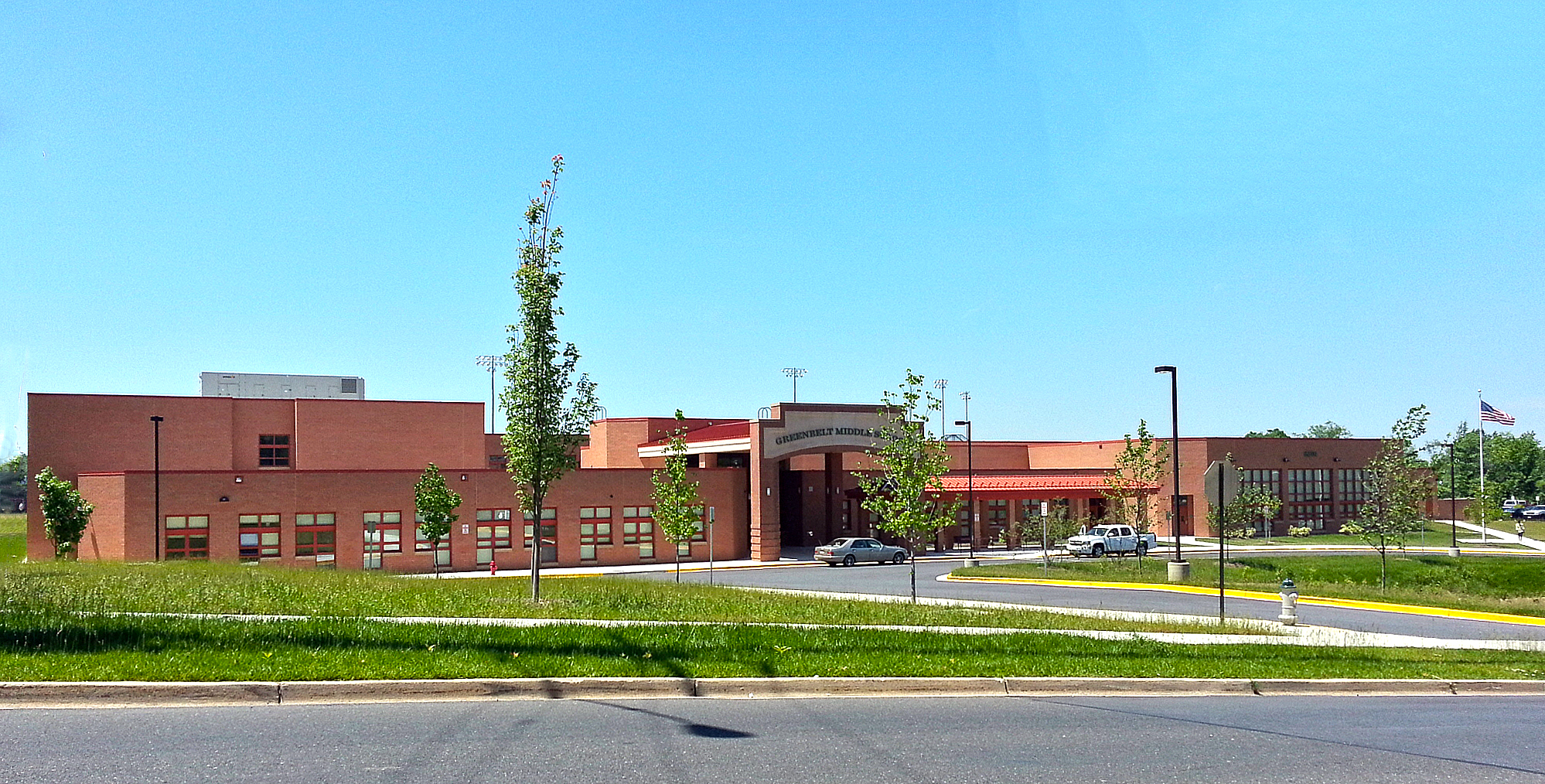
Greenbelt Middle School

Intermediate schools are referred to as "middle schools" in the PGCPS system, and operate as grades 6–8 middle schools. Grades 7–9 junior high school were phased out in the mid-1980s. Recent efforts have been made to convert most middle schools to the more popular grades 6–8 model. Issues in the past such as over-enrollment, lack of classroom space, and funding, had made it hard to convert all middle schools to a grades 6–8 configuration, but with increased funding and the addition of new middle schools, the transition is slowly being made, to be completed by the beginning of SY2024-2025.

Most middle schools in Prince George's County operate with a "comprehensive" model, as their base. Most students are assigned to a middle school based on an "attendance area." Most magnet programs operate as a "School-Within-A-School" model, where the magnet serves as an alternative program, in addition to the main comprehensive program, and students from outside the regular attendance area of the middle school are enrolled and accepted into the magnet, either through "continuity" (automatic continuation from an elementary school magnet program to the middle school level equivalent) or more commonly, through a magnet lottery, where students apply for a magnet program and are granted acceptance through a random drawing. Almost all middle schools have a whole-school "Signature Program" that includes a specialized program of instruction which is the foundation of the school's comprehensive program.

All middle schools in the PGCPS operate on a staggered school day schedule, where some middle schools start as early as 7:30 am and the end as early as 2:25 pm, and other middle schools start as late as 9:00 am and end as late as 4:20 pm. All middle schools operate on a modified block scheduling system, where some classes meet for as long as 70-minutes, daily. For the 2012-13 school year and beyond, an additional 40-minutes of instruction time has been added to the school day for all middle schools and their students, within the school district.

In a cooperative effort of the county government, Board of Education, and the Maryland-National Capital Park & Planning Commission (M-NCPPC) some M-NCPPC community centers are physically connected to middle schools, throughout the district. The unique community park/school centers features shared use areas which include a gymnasium, multi-purpose room, exercise/fitness room, dance room, arts and crafts room, computer lab, offices; storage areas, patio area, and restrooms. There are tennis courts and unlighted fields located on-site at select centers.

Middle schools
School	Website	Location	Opening date (current facility)	Grades	Enrollment (2014–15)	Square footage	Attendance hours (start/end)	Specialized programs
Buck Lodge Middle School	Link	Adelphi	1958	6–8	1,085 students	122,497	7:30a – 2:50p	Current program(s): America's Choice School Design Signature Program; AVID Signature Program
Buck Lodge Middle School	Notes & comments:							
Charles Carroll Middle School	Link	New Carrollton	1961	6–8	985 students	114,778	7:30a – 2:50p	Current program(s): America's Choice School Design Signature Program
Charles Carroll Middle School	Notes & comments:							
Stephen Decatur Middle School and Community Center	Link	Clinton	1971	6–8	669 students	120,070	9:00a – 4:20p	Current program(s): AVID Signature Program
Stephen Decatur Middle School and Community Center	Notes & comments: This school has a full community/recreation center directly connected to the facility.							
Drew-Freeman Middle School	Link	Suitland	1960	6-8	662 students	142,413	7:45a – 2:25p	Current program(s): America's Choice School Design Signature Program
Drew-Freeman Middle School	Notes & comments:							
Dwight D. Eisenhower Middle School	Link	Laurel	1969	6-8	905 students	139,951	8:30a – 3:10p	Current program(s): International Baccalureate (IB) Middle Years Programme; AVID Signature Program
Dwight D. Eisenhower Middle School	Notes & comments: Eisenhower is an IB World School.							
Greenbelt Middle School	Link	Greenbelt	2012	6-8	1,166 students	143,277	9:00a – 3:40p	Current program(s): Talented and Gifted Center (TAG) Magnet Program; America's Choice School Design Signature Program
Greenbelt Middle School	Notes & comments: A new $32 million, 143,277-square-foot, 990-student, LEED-certified Greenbelt Middle School, opened in August 2012 to replace the old facility which dated back to 1937. The total project cost 53.6 million USD. The new school opened with the addition of a new Talented and Gifted (TAG) Center magnet program for the northern area of the county. Greenbelt is also a 2013 Excellence in Gifted and Talented Education (EGATE) School, and a Bronze Medalist recipient of the Healthy School Award.							
Gwynn Park Middle School	Link	Brandywine	1968	6-8	563 students	129,348	7:45a – 2:25p	Current program(s): AVID Signature Program
Gwynn Park Middle School	Notes & comments:							
Hyattsville Middle School	Link	Hyattsville	1938	6-8	818 students	119,597	9:00a – 4:20p	Current program(s): Creative and Performing Arts Magnet Program
Hyattsville Middle School	Notes & comments:							
Thomas Johnson Middle School	Link	Lanham	1968	6-8	1,000 students	133,631	9:00a – 4:20p	Current program(s):
Thomas Johnson Middle School	Notes & comments:							
Dr. Ernest Everett Just Middle School	Link	Mitchellville	2002	6-8	658 students	122,220	7:30a – 2:50p	Current program(s): AVID Signature Program; Project Lead The Way Pre-Engineering Academy
Dr. Ernest Everett Just Middle School	Notes & comments: This school shares its space with a full community/recreation center which is directly connected to the facility.							
Kenmoor Middle School	Link	Landover	1973	6-8	691 students	128,381	9:00a – 4:20p	Current program(s): Talented and Gifted Center (TAG) Magnet Program; AVID Signature Program
Kenmoor Middle School	Notes & comments: Kenmoor Middle School is a 1989 National Blue Ribbon School of Excellence and a 1989 Maryland Blue Ribbon School.							
Kettering Middle School	Link	Kettering	1977	6-8	740 students	120,800	7:30a – 2:50p	Current program(s): America's Choice School Design Signature Program
Kettering Middle School	Notes & comments: Kettering Middle School is a 1993 National Blue Ribbon School of Excellence and a 1993 Maryland Blue Ribbon School.							
Martin Luther King, Jr. Middle School	Link	Beltsville	1972	6-8	669 students	127,516	9:30a – 4:10p	Current program(s): AVID Signature Program
Martin Luther King, Jr. Middle School	Notes & comments: Martin Luther King, Jr. Middle School is a 1993 National Blue Ribbon School of Excellence and a 1993 Maryland Blue Ribbon School.							
James Madison Middle School	Link	Upper Marlboro	1972	6-8	761 students	129,348	9:00a – 4:20p	Current program(s): International Baccalaureate (IB) Middle Years Programme
James Madison Middle School	Notes & comments: James Madison Middle School is an IB World School.							
Thurgood G. Marshall Middle School	Link	Camp Springs	1962	6-8	600 students	120,192	7:45a – 2:50p	Current program(s): America's Choice School Design Signature Program
Thurgood G. Marshall Middle School	Notes & comments:							
Samuel Ogle Middle School	Link	Bowie	1967	6-8	859 students	133,631	9:00a – 4:20p	Current program(s): AVID Signature Program
Samuel Ogle Middle School	Notes & comments:							
Nicholas Orem Middle School	Link	Hyattsville	1962	6-8	868 students	105,697	9:15a – 4:35p	Current program(s): America's Choice School Design Signature Program; AVID Signature Program; Project Lead The Way Pre-Engineering Academy
Nicholas Orem Middle School	Notes & comments:							
Oxon Hill Middle School	Link	Fort Washington	1972	6-8	593 students	106,801	9:15a – 4:35p	Current program(s): AVID Signature Program
Oxon Hill Middle School	Notes & comments:							
Benjamin Stoddert Middle School	Link	Marlow Heights	1957	6-8	629 students	101,862	101,862	Current program(s): America's Choice School Design Signature Program
Benjamin Stoddert Middle School	Notes & comments:							
Benjamin Tasker Middle School	Link	Bowie	1970	6-8	832 students	161,678	7:30a – 2:50p	Current program(s): AVID Signature Program
Benjamin Tasker Middle School	Notes & comments:							
Walker Mill Middle School	Link	Walker Mill	1970	6-8	743 students	129,348	9:00a – 4:20p	Current program(s): Talented and Gifted Center (TAG) Magnet Program; AVID Signature Program
Walker Mill Middle School	Notes & comments: Walker Mill was recognized as a 2011 Excellence in Gifted and Talented Education (EGATE) School.							
William Wirt Middle School	Link	Riverdale	1964	6-8	1,013 students	106,318	9:00a – 4:20p	Current program(s): America's Choice School Design Signature Program
William Wirt Middle School	Notes & comments:							

=== Dedicated magnet schools ===
Dedicated magnet schools are offered in the PGCPS system at the PreK-8th grade, elementary and middle school level only. As of 2012-13, Glenarden Woods and Heather Hills are the only full elementary-level dedicated magnet schools in the system. Dedicated magnet schools are "whole school" programs and differ from traditional comprehensive schools, as (1) all students at the school are enrolled and receive instruction in the magnet program and (2) traditional attendance areas for assigning students to a school are replaced by much larger geographical attendance zones, usually split between north county (areas north of Central Avenue) and south county (areas south of Central Avenue). Whole school, dedicated magnet programs are offered through the Creative and Performing Arts, French Immersion, Montessori, and Talented & Gifted Center magnet programs. Students receive specialized instruction that varies from the typical comprehensive program, offered at most other schools. Students are selected for the magnet programs through a magnet lottery for the French Immersion and Montessori programs and also for the Creative and Performing Arts program at the elementary school level. Acceptance into the Creative and Performing Arts program is through audition only at the middle school level. Acceptance into the TAG Centers at Glenarden Woods and Heather Hills Elementary Schools is through specialized TAG testing only.

Magnet schools
School	Website	Location	Opening date (current facility)	Grades	Enrollment (2014–15)	Square footage	Attendance hours (start/end)	Specialized programs
Maya Angelou French Immersion	Link	Temple Hills	N/A	ES K-5; MS 6–8	489 students	N/A	9:15a – 3:55p	Current program(s): French Immersion Magnet Program
Maya Angelou French Immersion	Notes & comments: This magnet school serves all PGCPS students who live south of Central Avenue. Maya Angelou French Immersion is an IB World School.							
Capitol Heights Partial Spanish Immersion	Link	Capitol Heights	N/A	K-6		N/A	9:00a - 3:25p	Current program(s): Partial Spanish Dual Language Program STEM Program TAG Magnet Center
Capitol Heights Partial Spanish Immersion	Notes & comments: This magnet school is a partial Spanish Dual Language STEM program (math and science in Spanish for grades K-3).							
César Chávez Dual Language Spanish Immersion	Link	Hyattsville	N/A	K-5	234 students	N/A	7:45a – 1:55p	Current program(s): Spanish Dual Language Program
César Chávez Dual Language Spanish Immersion	Notes & comments:							
Benjamin D. Foulois Creative and Performing Arts Academy	Link	Suitland	1968	ES K-5; MS 6–8	546 students	114,715	9:15a – 3:55p	Current program(s): Creative and Performing Arts Magnet Program
Benjamin D. Foulois Creative and Performing Arts Academy	Notes & comments: This magnet school serves all PGCPS students who live south of Central Avenue.							
Glenarden Woods Elementary School	Link	Glenarden	1960	2-5	483 students	52,061	9:15a – 3:40p	Current program(s): Talented and Gifted Center (TAG) Magnet Program
Glenarden Woods Elementary School	Notes & comments: Glendarden Woods is a 2005-06 National Blue Ribbon School of Excellence, a 2005-06 Maryland Blue Ribbon School, and a 2012 Excellence in Gifted and Talented Education (EGATE) School. Starting in the 2012-13 school year, PGCPS designated the school as a dedicated TAG Center magnet school.							
Robert Goddard Montessori	Link	Seabrook	1964	ES PreK-5; MS 6–8	516 students	133,631	9:15a – 3:55p	Current program(s): Montessori Magnet Program
Robert Goddard Montessori	Notes & comments: This magnet school serves all PGCPS students who live north of Central Avenue. Robert Goddard Montessori previously shared its space with Dora Kennedy French Immersion (formerly Robert Goddard French Immersion). However, the French Immersion program moved into its own dedicated facility in Greenbelt, Maryland, which formerly housed the old Greenbelt Middle School.							
John Hanson Montessori	Link	Oxon Hill	1956	ES PreK-5; MS 6–8	468 students	110,413	9:15a – 3:55p	Current program(s): Montessori Magnet Program
John Hanson Montessori	Notes & comments: This magnet school serves all PGCPS students who live south of Central Avenue.							
Heather Hills Elementary School	Link	Bowie	1967	2-5	388 students	36,825	7:45a – 1:55p	Current program(s): Talented and Gifted Center (TAG) Magnet Program
Heather Hills Elementary School	Notes & comments: Heather Hills is a 1989-90 National Blue Ribbon School of Excellence, 1989-90 Maryland Blue Ribbon School, and a 2013 Excellence in Gifted and Talented Education (EGATE) School. Starting in the 2012-13 school year, PGCPS designated Heather Hills as a dedicated TAG Center magnet school.							
Judith P. Hoyer Montessori	Link	Landover	N/A	PreK-8	N/A	N/A	9:15a – 3:25p	Current program(s): Montessori Magnet Program
Judith P. Hoyer Montessori	Notes & comments:							
Dora Kennedy French Immersion	Link	Greenbelt	1938	ES K-5; MS 6–8	610 students	N/A	9:15a – 3:55p	Current program(s): French Immersion Magnet Program
Dora Kennedy French Immersion	Notes & comments: This magnet school serves all PGCPS students who live north of Central Avenue. Dora Kennedy French Immersion formerly occupied the same facility as Robert Goddard Montessori, but that changed in the fall of 2014 when Dora Kennedy French Immersion relocated to the former building of Greenbelt Middle School. Greenbelt is now located in a brand new facility, located behind Dora Kennedy. The school was renamed to Dora Kennedy French Immersion during the summer of 2015, having been previously known as the Robert Goddard French Immersion. Dora Kennedy is a 2014 National Blue Ribbon School of Excellence, a 2014 Maryland Blue Ribbon School, and a Green School.							
Overlook Spanish Immersion	Link	Temple Hills	N/A	K-5	N/A	N/A	9:15a – 3:25p	Current program(s): Spanish Immersion Magnet Program
Overlook Spanish Immersion	Notes & comments: This full Spanish Immersion school serves all PGCPS students who live south of Central Avenue.							
Thomas G. Pullen Creative and Performing Arts Academy	Link	Landover	1967	ES K-5; MS 6–8	730 students	110,422	9:15a – 3:55p	Current program(s): Creative and Performing Arts Magnet Program
Thomas G. Pullen Creative and Performing Arts Academy	Notes & comments: This magnet school serves all PGCPS students who live south of Central Avenue.							
Phyllis E. Williams Spanish Immersion	Link	Upper Marlboro	1974	K-5	420 students	N/A	9:15a – 3:25p	Current program(s): Spanish Immersion Magnet Program
Phyllis E. Williams Spanish Immersion	Notes & comments: This full Spanish Immersion school serves all PGCPS students who live north of Central Avenue.							

=== Combined elementary and middle schools ===
Pre-kindergarten through grade 8 schools are essentially combined elementary and middle schools, facilitated in one building. Most of these schools are referred to as "academies" in the school district. The elementary school usually starts at pre-kindergarten and ends at grade 5 and the middle school starts at grade 6 and ends at grade 8. These schools usually offer a slightly enhanced standard of learning and studies have suggested that students have benefited from being in one continuous facility from kindergarten through 8th grade, without having the disruption having to attend a brand new school, for the middle school years. Cora L. Rice Elementary School and G. James Gholson Middle School are not true academies. Both schools are housed in one facility but they operate as two completely separate schools for all intents and purposes.

Academies
School	Website	Location	Opening date (current facility)	Grades	Enrollment (2014–15)	Square footage	Attendance hours (start/end)	Specialized programs
The Accokeek Academy (Under Campus)	Link	Accokeek	1963	K-4	1,417 (total)	N/A	ES 9:15a – 3:25p	Current program(s): Talented and Gifted Center (TAG) Magnet Program; AVID Signature Program
The Accokeek Academy (Under Campus)	Notes & comments: Accokeek Academy comprises two separate campuses, and was formed in the mid-2010s by the combining of Henry G. Ferguson Elementary School and Eugene Burroughs Middle School, both facilities being adjacent to one another. In the fall of 2014, a new building for the elementary school-level was completed, located between the old middle school building and the old elementary school building. Currently, the middle school level occupies the new building, while the old middle school building undergoes an extensive renovation. The elementary school occupies the former Ferguson building. When construction is completed, the new elementary school building will be known as the "under campus" while the new middle school building will be known as the "upper campus." The old Ferguson building will be demolished. Accokeek Academy is a 2012 Excellence in Gifted and Talented Education (EGATE) award school.							
The Accokeek Academy (Upper Campus)	Link	Accokeek	1963	ES Gr. 5 MS 6–8	1,417 (total)	N/A	ES 9:15a – 3:25p MS 9:15a – 3:55p	Current program(s): Talented and Gifted Center (TAG) Magnet Program; AVID Signature Program
The Accokeek Academy (Upper Campus)	Notes & comments: Accokeek Academy comprises two separate campuses, and was formed in the mid-2010s by the combining of Henry G. Ferguson Elementary School and Eugene Burroughs Middle School, both facilities being adjacent to one another. In the fall of 2014, a new building for the elementary school level was completed, located between the old middle school building. Currently, the middle school-level occupies the new building, while the old middle school building undergoes an extensive renovation. The elementary school occupies the former Ferguson building. When construction is completed, the new elementary school building will be known as the "under campus" while the new middle school building will be known as the "upper campus." The old Ferguson building will be demolished. Accokeek Academy is a 2012 Excellence in Gifted and Talented Education (EGATE) award school.							
Beltsville Academy	Link	Beltsville	1961	ES PreK-5; MS 6–8	1,040	110,597	8:30a – 3:10p	Current program(s):
Beltsville Academy	Notes & comments: Beltsville Academy operated as Beltsville Elementary School and previously as Beltsville Academic Center (when Beltsville housed the now eliminated "Academic Center Magnet Program"), until the 2008-2009 school year, when it was converted to a kindergarten through 8th grade school.							
William W. Hall Academy	Link	Capitol Heights	2005	ES PreK-5; MS 6–8	548	100,000	7:45a – 2:25p	Current program(s):
William W. Hall Academy	Notes & comments: This school shares its space with a full community/recreation center, which is directly connected to the facility. William Hall was converted from a PreK-6 elementary school to a PreK-8 academy in 2009.							
Andrew Jackson Academy	Link	Forestville	1971	ES K-5; MS 6–8	560	151,163	8:30a – 3:10p	Current program(s):
Andrew Jackson Academy	Notes & comments: Andrew Jackson was converted from a grades 6-8 middle school to a PreK-8 academy in 2009.							
Samuel P. Massie Academy	Link	Forestville	2003	ES PreK–5; MS 6–8	676	97,243	7:45a – 2:25p	Current program(s):
Samuel P. Massie Academy	Notes & comments: This school shares its space with a full community/recreation center, which is directly connected to the facility. Massie was converted from a preK-5 elementary School to a preK-8 academy in 2009.							
Colin Powell Academy		Fort Washington	2023	ES PreK–5; MS 6–8				Current program(s):
Colin Powell Academy	Notes & comments: Merger of Gourdine Middle and Potomac Landing Elementary.							
Cora L. Rice Elementary School; G. James Gholson Middle School	ES Link; MS Link	Landover	2002	ES PreK-6; MS 7–8	ES 743; MS 691; Total: 1,434	ES 83,482; MS 115,868; Total: 199,350	ES 7:45a – 1:55p MS 9:00a – 4:20p	Current program(s): America's Choice School Design Signature Program
Cora L. Rice Elementary School; G. James Gholson Middle School	Notes & comments: Cora L. Rice Elementary and G. James Gholson Middle are both housed in one building.							

=== Elementary schools ===
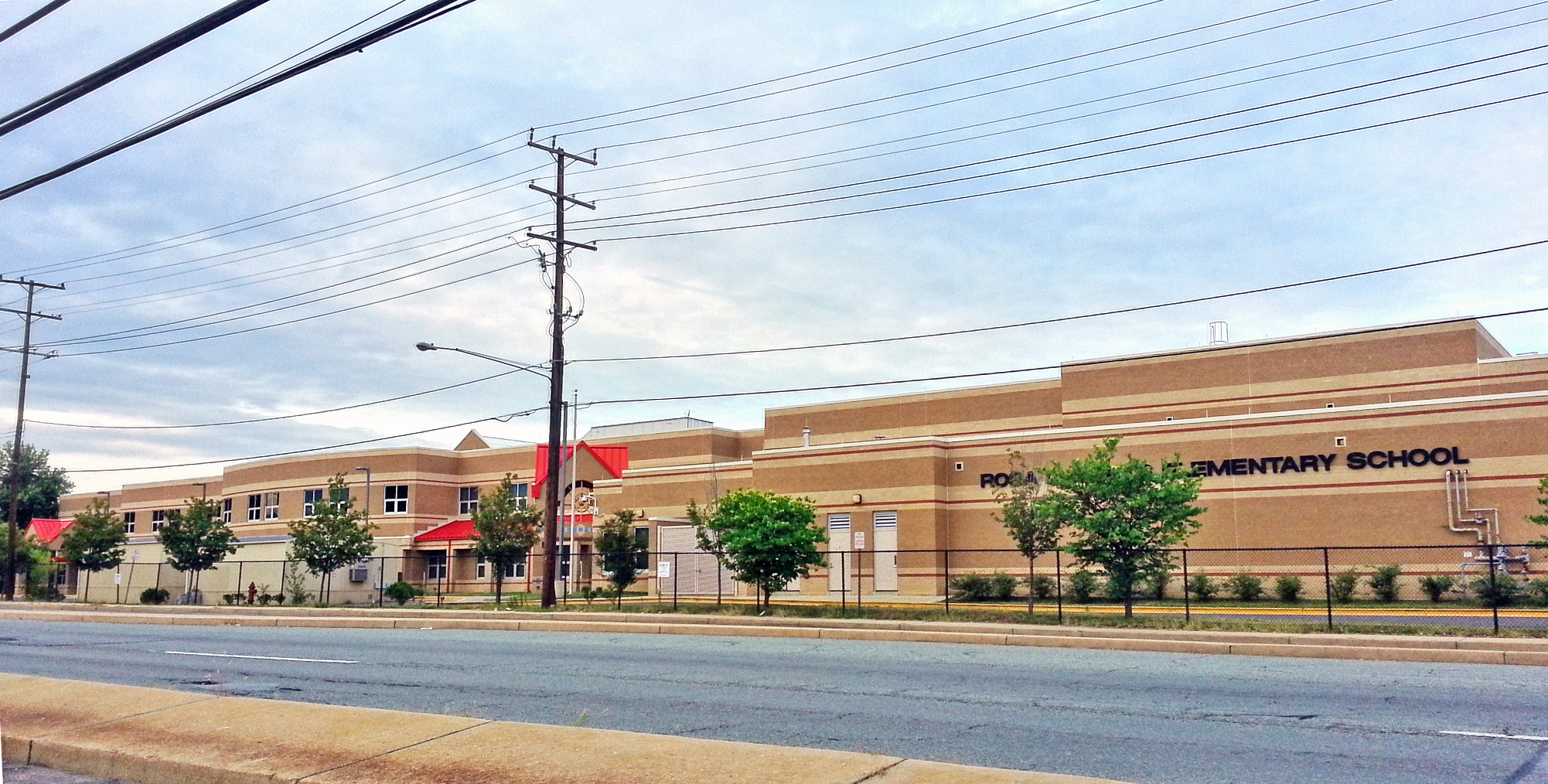
Rosa L. Parks Elementary School

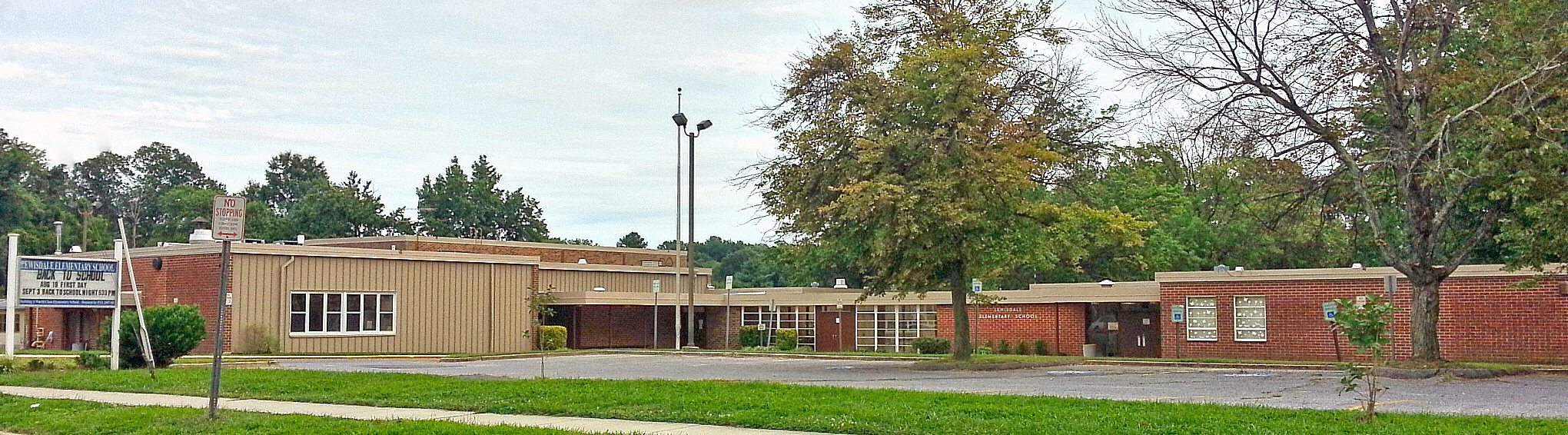
Lewisdale Elementary School

Elementary schools in Prince George's County operate in several configurations, ranging from Pre-K (Head Start) through grade 6. Most elementary schools operate under a kindergarten through grade 6 configuration, and lack a pre-kindergarten/Head Start program. More recently, with boundary realignments to ease overcrowding and with the opening of newer and larger schools and increased funding, several schools have changed to a PreK-6th grade configuration while others have added a Pre-kindergarten, but dropped the sixth grade, to change to a Pre-K through grade 5 school. The sixth grades from those schools were added to the elementary schools' feeder middle schools.

In a cooperative effort of the county government, board of education, and the Maryland National Capital Park & Planning Commission (M-NCPPC), several M-NCPPC community centers are physically connected to elementary schools, throughout the district. The unique community park/school centers features shared use areas which include a gymnasium, multi-purpose room, exercise/fitness room, dance room, arts and crafts room, computer lab, offices, storage areas, patio area, and restrooms. Tennis courts and unlighted fields are located on-site at select centers.

Elementary schools
School	Website	Location	Lowest grade	Highest grade	Enrollment	Specialized programs	Notes & comments
Adelphi Elementary School	Link	Adelphi	Kindergarten	Grade 6	391	America's Choice School Design Signature Program	
Allenwood Elementary School	Link	Camp Springs	Kindergarten	Grade 6	444		
Apple Grove Elementary School	Link	Fort Washington	Pre-Kindergarten	Grade 6	504		
Ardmore Elementary School	Link	Springdale	Kindergarten	Grade 5	543		
Arrowhead Elementary School	Link	Upper Marlboro	Pre-Kindergarten	Grade 6	520		
Avalon Elementary School	Link	Fort Washington	Kindergarten	Grade 6	346		
Baden Elementary School and Community Center	Link	Brandywine	Pre-kindergarten	Grade 6	258		This school shares its space with a full community/recreation center which is directly connected to the facility.
Barnaby Manor Elementary School	Link	Oxon Hill	Pre-kindergarten	Grade 6	543	America's Choice School Design Signature Program	
John H. Bayne Elementary School	Link	Capitol Heights	Pre-kindergarten	Grade 6	485		
Beacon Heights Elementary School	Link	Riverdale	Pre-kindergarten	Grade 6	482		2004 Maryland Blue Ribbon School and a 2004 National Blue Ribbon School of Excellence
William Beanes Elementary School and Community Center	Link	Suitland	Pre-Kindergarten	Grade 6	480		This school shares its space with a full community/recreation center which is directly connected to the facility.
Berwyn Heights Elementary School	Link	Berwyn Heights	Kindergarten	Grade 6	473		
Bladensburg Elementary School	Link	Bladensburg	Pre-kindergarten	Grade 6	665		
Bond Mill Elementary School	Link	Laurel	Kindergarten	Grade 6	451		Maryland Blue Ribbon School
Bradbury Heights Elementary School	Link	Bradbury Heights	Pre-kindergarten	Grade 6	560	America's Choice School Design Signature Program	
Brandywine Elementary School	Link	Brandywine	Pre-kindergarten	Grade 5	522		
Doswell E. Brooks Elementary School	Link	Coral Hills	Kindergarten	Grade 6	308		
Calverton Elementary School	Link	Calverton	Pre-kindergarten	Grade 5	777		
Capitol Heights Elementary School	Link	Capitol Heights	Pre-kindergarten	Grade 6	221	Talented and Gifted Center (TAG) Magnet Program	Capitol Heights is a 2013 Excellence in Gifted and Talented Education (EGATE) School.
Carmody Hills Elementary School	Link	Carmody Hills	Pre-kindergarten	Grade 6	382	America's Choice School Design Signature Program	
Carole Highlands Elementary School	Link	Carole Highlands	Pre-kindergarten	Grade 6	674		
Carrollton Elementary School	Link	New Carrollton	Pre-kindergarten	Grade 6	766		
Samuel Chase Elementary School	Link	Temple Hills	Pre-kindergarten	Grade 6	330		
Cherokee Lane Elementary School	Link	Adelphi	Kindergarten	Grade 6	434		
Chillum Elementary School	Link	Chillum	Pre-kindergarten	Grade 6	313	America's Choice School Design Signature Program	
Thomas Claggett Elementary School	Link	District Heights	Pre-kindergarten	Grade 6	260		
Clinton Grove Elementary School	Link	Clinton	Kindergarten	Grade 6	388	America's Choice School Design Signature Program	
Columbia Park Elementary School and Community Center	Link	Landover	Pre-kindergarten	Grade 6	454		This school shares its space with a full community/recreation center which is directly connected to the facility. Columbia Park was named a 1988 National Blue Ribbon School of Excellence.
Concord Elementary School	Link	District Heights	Pre-kindergarten	Grade 6	372		
Cool Spring Elementary School	Link	Adelphi	Pre-kindergarten	Grade 6	800		
Cooper Lane Elementary School	Link	Landover Hills	Pre-kindergarten	Grade 6	490		
Deerfield Run Elementary School and Community Center	Link	Laurel	Pre-kindergarten	Grade 6	549		This school shares its space with a full community/recreation center which is directly connected to the facility.
J. Frank Dent Elementary School	Link	Fort Washington	Pre-kindergarten	Grade 6	226	America's Choice School Design Signature Program	
District Heights Elementary School	Link	District Heights	Pre-kindergarten	Grade 6	469		
Dodge Park Elementary School	Link	Landover	Pre-kindergarten	Grade 6	495		
Francis T. Evans Elementary School	Link	Clinton	Kindergarten	Grade 5	540		
Edward M. Felegy Elementary School	Link	Hyattsville	Pre-kindergarten	Grade 5	686	Creative and performing arts theme school	Edward M. Felegy opened in August 2014. It is a LEED-certified facility and a creative and performing arts (CPA) theme school, aligning with the CPA magnet program at Hyattsville Middle School, and the Center for the Visual and Performing Arts magnet program at Northwestern High School.
Flintstone Elementary School	Link	Oxon Hill	Pre-kindergarten	Grade 6	380		
Forest Heights Elementary School	Link	Forest Heights	Pre-kindergarten	Grade 6	226		
Fort Foote Elementary School	Link	Fort Washington	Pre-kindergarten	Grade 6	386		2001 National Blue Ribbon School of Excellence
Fort Washington Forest Elementary School	Link	Fort Washington	Kindergarten	Grade 6	350		
Robert Frost Elementary School	Link	New Carrollton	Pre-kindergarten	Grade 6	285		
Gaywood Elementary School	Link	Seabrook	Pre-kindergarten	Grade 5	491		
Glassmanor Elementary School and Community Center	Link	Glassmanor	Pre-kindergarten	Grade 6	326		This school shares its space with a full community/recreation center which is directly connected to the facility.
Glenn Dale Elementary School	Link	Glenn Dale	Kindergarten	Grade 5	567		
Glenridge Elementary School	Link	Woodlawn	Pre-kindergarten	Grade 6	685		
Robert R. Gray Elementary School	Link	Chapel Oaks	Pre-kindergarten	Grade 6	387	America's Choice School Design Signature Program	
Greenbelt Elementary School	Link	Greenbelt	Pre-kindergarten	Grade 5	600		1991-92 National Blue Ribbon School of Excellence; 1991-92 Maryland Blue Ribbon School; 2014 Excellence in Gifted and Talented Education (EGATE) School. Greenbelt Elementary School is sometimes credited as "Greenbelt Center Elementary School". The latter was used as the official school name from the year the school first opened until the early part of the 21st century, until "Center" was dropped.
James H. Harrison Elementary School	Link	Laurel	Kindergarten	Grade 6	292		
High Bridge Elementary School	Link	Bowie	Kindergarten	Grade 5	427		
Highland Park Elementary School	Link	Landover	Pre-kindergarten	Grade 6	189		Talented and Gifted Center (TAG) Magnet Program
Hillcrest Heights Elementary School	Link	Hillcrest Heights	Pre-kindergarten	Grade 5	504	America's Choice School Design Signature Program	
Hollywood Elementary School	Link	College Park	Kindergarten	Grade 6	444		
Hyattsville Elementary School	Link	Hyattsville	Pre-kindergarten	Grade 5	508		
Indian Queen Elementary School and Community Center	Link	Fort Washington	Pre-kindergarten	Grade 6	359		This school shares its space with a full community/recreation center which is directly connected to the facility.
Mary Harris "Mother" Jones Elementary School	Link	Adelphi	Pre-kindergarten	Grade 6	736		
Kenilworth Elementary School	Link	Bowie	Kindergarten	Grade 5	395		
Kenmoor Elementary School	Link	Landover	Pre-kindergarten	4 year old	369		For 2012-13 and beyond, PGCPS removed the Talented and Gifted Center (TAG) Magnet Program at Kenmoor Elementary School. Kenmoor was recognized as a 2010 Excellence in Gifted and Talented Education (EGATE) School.
Kettering Elementary School	Link	Kettering	Pre-kindergarten	Grade 5	412		
Francis Scott Key Elementary School	Link	District Heights	Pre-kindergarten	Grade 6	626	America's Choice School Design Signature Program	
Kingsford Elementary School	Link	Mitchellville	Pre-kindergarten	Grade 6	776	Talented and Gifted Center (TAG) Magnet Program	
Lake Arbor Elementary School	Link	Lake Arbor	Kindergarten	Grade 5	874		
Lamont Elementary School	Link	New Carrollton	Pre-kindergarten	Grade 5	655		
Langley Park-McCormick Elementary School	Link	Langley Park	Pre-kindergarten	Grade 6	461		
Laurel Elementary School	Link	Laurel	Pre-kindergarten	Grade 6	551		
Lewisdale Elementary School	Link	Lewisdale	Pre-kindergarten	Grade 5	565		
Longfields Elementary School	Link	Forestville	Pre-kindergarten	Grade 6	387	Talented and Gifted Center (TAG) Magnet Program	
Magnolia Elementary School	Link	Lanham	Pre-kindergarten	Grade 6	451		
Marlton Elementary School	Link	Upper Marlboro	Kindergarten	Grade 5	550	Talented and Gifted Center (TAG) Magnet Program	
Mattaponi Elementary School	Link	Upper Marlboro	Kindergarten	Grade 6	465		Mattaponi is a 2013 Excellence in Gifted and Talented Education (EGATE) School.
James McHenry Elementary School	Link	Lanham	Pre-kindergarten	Grade 6	683	America's Choice School Design Signature Program	
Melwood Elementary School	Link	Upper Marlboro	Kindergarten	Grade 6	775	International Baccalaureate (IB) Primary Years Programme	Melwood is an IB World School.
Montpelier Elementary School	Link	Laurel	Pre-kindergarten	Grade 5	611		2011 Excellence in Gifted and Talented Education (EGATE) School
Mount Rainier Elementary School	Link	Mount Rainier	Pre-kindergarten	Grade 6	337		
North Forestville Elementary School	Link	Forestville	Pre-kindergarten	Grade 6	355		
Northview Elementary School	Link	Bowie	Pre-kindergarten	Grade 6	870		
Oakcrest Elementary School	Link	Landover	Pre-kindergarten	Grade 6	351		PGCPS permanently relocated the Talented and Gifted Center (TAG) Magnet Program at Oakcrest to Highland Park Elementary School.
Oaklands Elementary School	Link	Laurel	Pre-kndergarten	Grade 5	401		
Barack Obama Elementary School	Link	Upper Marlboro	Pre-kindergarten	Grade 5	725		Facility opened in August 2010 and became the second LEED certified educational facility in the county.
Oxon Hill Elementary School	Link	Oxon Hill	Pre-kindergarten	Grade 6	321		
William Paca Elementary School	Link	Landover	Pre-kindergarten	Grade 6	462		
Paint Branch Elementary School	Link	College Park	Pre-kindergarten	Grade 5	341		
Panorama Elementary School	Link	Hillcrest Heights	Pre-kindergarten	Grade 5	428	America's Choice School Design Signature Program	
Rosa L. Parks Elementary School	Link	Green Meadows	Kindergarten	Grade 6	784		
Patuxent Elementary School	Link	Upper Marlboro	Pre-kindergarten	Grade 5	575		
Perrywood Elementary School	Link	Largo	Kindergarten	Grade 5	706		
Pointer Ridge Elementary School	Link	Bowie	Kindergarten	Grade 5	453		
Port Towns Elementary School	Link	Bladensburg	Pre-kindergarten	Grade 6	790	America's Choice School Design Signature Program	
Princeton Elementary School	Link	Suitland	Pre-kindergarten	Grade 6	356		
James Ryder Randall Elementary School	Link	Clinton	Pre-kindergarten	Grade 6	452		
Catherine T. Reed Elementary School	Link	Lanham	Kindergarten	Grade 5	426		
Ridgecrest Elementary School	Link	Chillum	Pre-kindergarten	Grade 6	578	America's Choice School Design Signature Program	
Riverdale Elementary School	Link	Riverdale	Pre-kindergarten	Grade 5	660		
Rockledge Elementary School	Link	Bowie	Kindergarten	Grade 5	527		Maryland Blue Ribbon School and 2012 Excellence in Gifted and Talented Education (EGATE) School
Rogers Heights Elementary School	Link	Bladensburg	Pre-kindergarten	Grade 6	649		
Rosaryville Elementary School	Link	Rosaryville	Kindergarten	Grade 5	596		
Rose Valley Elementary School	Link	Fort Washington	Kindergarten	Grade 5	392		
Scotchtown Hills Elementary School	Link	Laurel	Pre-kindergarten	Grade 6	680		
Seabrook Elementary School	Link	Seabrook	Pre-kindergarten	Grade 6	380		
Seat Pleasant Elementary School	Link	Seat Pleasant	Pre-kindergarten	Grade 6	303		
Skyline Elementary School	Link	Suitland	Pre-kindergarten	Grade 6	221	Autism Program	
Gladys Noon Spellman Elementary School	Link	Cheverly	Pre-kindergarten	Grade 6	410	America's Choice School Design Signature Program	
Springhill Lake Elementary School	Link	Greenbelt	Kindergarten	Grade 5	471		
Thomas S. Stone Elementary School	Link	Mount Rainier	Pre-kindergarten	Grade 6	614	America's Choice School Design Signature Program	
Suitland Elementary School	Link	Suitland	Pre-kindergarten	Grade 6	538	America's Choice School Design Signature Program	
Tayac Elementary School	Link	Fort Washington	Pre-kindergarten	Grade 5	422		
Templeton Elementary School	Link	Riverdale	Pre-kindergarten	Grade 5	546		1999 Maryland Blue Ribbon School and a 1999 National Blue Ribbon School of Excellence
Tulip Grove Elementary School	Link	Bowie	Kindergarten	Grade 5	292		
University Park Elementary School	Link	University Park	Pre-Kindergarten	Grade 6	558		
Valley View Elementary School	Link	Oxon Hill	Pre-Kindergarten	Grade 6	493	Talented and Gifted Center (TAG) Magnet Program	2011 Excellence in Gifted and Talented Education (EGATE) School
Vansville Elementary School and Community Center	Link	Vansville	Pre-Kindergarten	Grade 5	862		This school shares its space with a full community/recreation center which is directly connected to the facility.
Waldon Woods Elementary School	Link	Clinton	Pre-Kindergarten	Grade 6	642		
Whitehall Elementary School	Link	Bowie	Kindergarten	Grade 5	431		2012 Maryland Blue Ribbon School and a 2012 National Blue Ribbon School of Excellence
Woodmore Elementary School	Link	Mitchellville	Kindergarten	Grade 6	482		
Woodridge Elementary School	Link	Woodlawn	Pre-Kindergarten	Grade 6	422		
Judge Sylvania W. Woods, Sr. Elementary School	Link	Glenarden	Pre-Kindergarten	Grade 6	353	America's Choice School Design Signature Program	
Yorktown Elementary School	Link	Bowie	Kindergarten	Grade 5	305		

Former schools:

- Potomac Landing Elementary School: Merged into Colin Powell Academy in 2023.

=== K-12 ===
- C. Elizabeth Rieg Regional

== Accolades and achievements ==
=== Newsweek's America's Best High Schools ===
In June 2010, seven PGCPS high school were listed in Newsweek's annual list of the top 1600 high schools in the nation. This was up from five county high schools which made the list from the previous year. The 2010 list included Eleanor Roosevelt High School in Greenbelt (#409), Oxon Hill High School in Oxon Hill (#957), Bowie High School in Bowie (#1,173), Laurel High School in Laurel (#1,343), High Point High School in Beltsville (#1,361), Central High School in Capitol Heights (#1,429), and Parkdale High School in Riverdale (#1,481).

The schools are ranked on the number of Advanced Placement, International Baccalaureate and/or Cambridge tests taken by all students in a school in 2009, divided by the number of graduating seniors, called the "Challenge Index". The schools represent the top six percent of all public high schools in America. In June 2009, five PGCPS high schools were named in the best high schools list. It included Bowie High School in Bowie, Charles Herbert Flowers High School in Springdale, High Point High School in Beltsville, Oxon Hill High School in Oxon Hill, and Eleanor Roosevelt High School in Greenbelt. Eleanor Roosevelt ranked the highest out of county schools at 372nd on the nationwide list, Oxon Hill ranked 918th, High Point ranked 961st, Bowie ranked 1,370th, and Charles Herbert Flowers ranked 1,445th.

=== U.S. News & World Report's Best High Schools ===
Since 2007, U.S. News & World Report has ranked high schools in PGCPS among the Best High Schools in America. High Point High School, Northwestern High School, and Eleanor Roosevelt High School have been recognized as Silver Medal Schools.

=== State and national Blue Ribbon Schools ===
PGCPS has 16 state Blue Ribbon Schools, 13 of which are USDE National Blue Ribbon Schools of Excellence.

==== National Blue Ribbon Schools of Excellence ====
- Beacon Heights Elementary School, Riverdale, 2003–04
- Columbia Park Elementary School, Landover, 1987–88
- Fort Foote Elementary School, Fort Washington, 2000–01
- Glenarden Woods Elementary School, Glenarden, 2005–06
- Greenbelt Center Elementary School, Greenbelt, 1991–92
- Heather Hills Elementary School, Bowie, 1989–90
- Templeton Elementary School, Riverdale, 1998–99
- Whitehall Elementary School, Bowie, 2011–12
- Kenmoor Middle School, Landover, 1988–89
- Dora Kennedy French Immersion, Greenbelt, 2013–14
- Kettering Middle School, Upper Marlboro, 1992–93
- Martin Luther King, Jr. Middle School, Beltsville, 1992–93
- Eleanor Roosevelt High School, Greenbelt, 1990–91 & 1997–98
- Suitland High School, Forestville, 1988–89

==== Maryland Blue Ribbon Schools ====
- Beacon Heights Elementary School, Riverdale, 2003–04
- Bond Mill Elementary School, Laurel (year N/A)
- Columbia Park Elementary School, Landover, 1987–88
- Fort Foote Elementary School, Fort Washington, 2000–01
- Glenarden Woods Elementary School, Glenarden, 2005–06
- Greenbelt Center Elementary School, Greenbelt, 1991–92
- Heather Hills Elementary School, Bowie, 1989–90 & 2006–07
- Rockledge Elementary School, Bowie, 1997–98
- Whitehall Elementary School, Bowie, 2011–12
- Templeton Elementary School, Riverdale, 1998–99
- Kenmoor Middle School, Landover, 1988–89
- Dora Kennedy French Immersion, Greenbelt, 2013–14
- Kettering Middle School, Upper Marlboro, 1992–93
- Martin Luther King, Jr. Middle School, Beltsville, 1992–93
- Eleanor Roosevelt High School, Greenbelt, 1990–91 & 1997–98
- Suitland High School, Forestville, 1988–89

== Magnet programs and centers ==
Magnet programs were first implemented in PGCPS in 1985, to fulfill a court-ordered desegregation mandate. Up until as late as the late 80s, Prince George's County had been predominantly white in terms of racial demographics. In order to desegregate mostly all-White schools in the school system, PGCPS created several magnet programs that eventually were instituted in over fifty schools, spread throughout the county.

By the late 1990s, the population demographics of the county had shifted towards a mostly African American majority. Magnet programs (as they were set up) were costing PGCPS approximately $14 million per year, to operate. The programs were costly and this was exacerbated by the fact that the school system's operating budget was greater than the final budget the school system had traditionally been allotted, an issue that had plagued the school system for years. Since the county's population now primarily consisted of African Americans, and due to the expense of operating the Magnet Schools Program, courts began to investigate the justification of PGCPS's magnet program. In 2004, a court ruled to discontinue court-ordered busing which had existed in the county, for over 30 years, based primarily on the fact that desegregation was no longer an issue in the predominantly Black Prince George's County.

With the ending of the court-ordered busing, also came changes to the school system's Magnet Schools Program. The program had gained national attention, as it was one of the largest in the country. It served as a model for school systems across the nation. Dr. Iris T. Metts, the superintendent of schools at the time, formulated an ambitious plan to actually expand the magnet programs in PGCPS, as well as reassign magnet programs that weren't performing well at one location, to other schools. Due to long and highly publicized in-house issues between Metts and the board of education, Metts was replaced by Dr. Andre Hornsby at the end of her contract with PGCPS. When Hornsby arrived, he essentially reversed the decision that Metts had made, in regards to the future of the county's magnet programs, and he decided to instead eliminate most of the school system's magnet programs, most of which had been identified as under-performing for several years. Ten magnet programs were identified for elimination, which proved extremely controversial because some of the proposed eliminated programs were located at sites in which the program in question had been extremely successful, such as the Academic Center magnet program at Martin Luther King, Jr. Academic Center, which had been the highest performing middle school in the system for several years and also was a blue ribbon school.

Despite the opposition by parents, in 2006 the magnet programs in PGCPS underwent an overhaul, and most of the magnets were eliminated. A few programs that were determined to be "successful" were either expanded and replicated at other locations, or consolidated and relocated to a dedicated magnet school that would serve large geographic areas of the county.

=== Current magnet programs ===
ES = elementary school; MS = middle school; HS = high school

- Aerospace Engineering and Aviation Technology Program (HS)
- Biomedical (HS)
- Biotechnology (HS)
- Career and Technical Education (HS)
- Centers for Visual and Performing Arts (HS)
- Chinese Immersion (ES, MS)
- Creative and Performing Arts (ES, MS)
- French Immersion (ES, MS, HS)
- International Baccalaureate (HS)
- Montessori (ES, MS)
- Science and Technology Center (HS)
- Spanish Dual Language Program (ES)
- Spanish Immersion (ES, MS)
- Talented and Gifted Center (ES, MS)

=== Magnet program descriptions ===
==== Aerospace Engineering and Aviation Technology ====
The Aerospace Engineering and Aviation Technology program is a college and career preparatory program, offering areas of study in Aerospace Engineering and Aviation Technology. It is supported by partnerships with the College Park Aviation Museum, NASA, local colleges and universities, and private industry. This program is designed to prepare students for college and high-demand careers. Each student receives a laptop upon entry into the program, and is provided with transportation.

Admission to the program is based on the same criteria and examination used for the Science and Technology Center.

Locations:

- DuVal High School

==== Biomedical ====
The Biomedical Program at Bladensburg High School is a high school curriculum that focuses on medical and health careers, such as physicians and research doctors. Students who have a strong interest in pursuing a career in health-related fields have an opportunity to engage in biomedical research, internships, and practicums, and to enroll in medical-related science courses and other advanced placement courses. The curriculum introduces students to a wide variety of medical careers through field trips, speakers in the medical field, internships, accelerated courses, a wide variety of electives related to the biological and social sciences, and independent research.

Locations:

- Bladensburg High School

==== Biotechnology ====
The Biotechnology Program offers a four-year, college-preparatory program of study in molecular biology, biochemistry and technical career training that includes scanning electron microscopy. Students have first-hand experience with the advanced technologies used in biotechnology research, academia, and industry.

Courses are taught in modern laboratory classrooms equipped with the latest biotechnology instrumentation. The facilities include gel electrophoresis, refrigerated centrifugation, scanning spectrophotometry, high pressure liquid chromatography, gas chromatography and access to scanning electron microscopy. Computers will support classroom instruction as well as student initiated research projects.

Students study biotechnology theory and technique in a cyclic fashion where concepts introduced in beginning courses will be emphasized in depth during upper level classes. Mini-research projects are conducted by science students to demonstrate their understanding of course content and laboratory procedures. Complementing the specific science offerings of the Biotechnology Program is a full selection of courses, including Advanced Placement level in English, social studies and mathematics.

Eligibility Requirements: Students who express interest are eligible to apply. No pre-testing is required. Admission to the program is through a race-neutral random magnet lottery application process, on a space-available basis.

Locations:

- Fairmont Heights High School
- Largo High School

==== Career and Technical Education (CTE) Program ====
The Technical Academy is a program that provides students with technical skills and knowledge. Benefits to students include gaining a foundation for a college major in a technical field, having access to a technical career after high school if college is postponed, and having access to a part-time technical job to help with college expenses.

Locations:

- Bladensburg High School
- Crossland High School
- Gwynn Park High School
- Laurel High School
- Suitland High School

==== Centers for the Visual and Performing Arts ====
The Centers for the Visual and Performing Arts (CVPA) has been in existence since 1986, originally at Suitland High School. The program was expanded to Northwestern High School in the fall of 2013. The CVPA is a rigorous four-year arts program that offers artistically talented high school students educational opportunities designed to prepare them artistically for college, professional study, or career options in the arts. Strong association with the arts in the Washington, DC-area offers distinct advantages. Students study with professional artists, dancers, actors, musicians, singers, directors/producers, and radio/television personalities. Students explore, and eventually major, in any one of the six principal concentrations: vocal music, instrumental music, dance, theatre, visual arts, and interactive media production. Suitland High School offers a 1000-seat auditorium and experimental theatre, a fully equipped dance studio, and a television and recording studio. Northwestern High School offers an 1100-seat auditorium, fully equipped dance studio, state-of-the-art music rooms, several music practice rooms, a piano lab, and a television and recording studio. Admission into the CVPA magnet program is through audition only.

Locations:

- Northwestern High School
- Suitland High School

==== Creative and Performing Arts ====
The Creative and Performing Arts Magnet Program is located at three sites. The programs at Thomas G. Pullen and Benjamin D. Foulois are open to students in Kindergarten through eighth grade; the program at Hyattsville Middle School is open to students in seventh and eighth grade (Hyattsville Middle School has a limited program boundary).

The Creative and Performing Arts Magnet Program is designed to develop the interest and talents of students in the arts, and feature an enhanced interdisciplinary academic program that encourages creative and artistic expression. Experiences and training are designed to challenge and develop skills of all students, as well as to provide exceptional opportunities for artistically talented students.

The curriculum provides in-depth experiences in each art discipline, plus related arts experiences and an infusion of the arts in the overall curriculum. The arts are provided as an integral part of a strong academic program.

The Creative Arts Schools follow the general curriculum guidelines that are used for all Prince George's County public elementary and middle schools. Basic instruction is provided in reading, mathematics, English, science, and social studies, as well as specialized instruction in the arts - art, drama, music, dance, physical education, creative writing, media production, literary arts, and related computer lab experiences.

Locations:

- Thomas G. Pullen Creative and Performing Arts Academy
- Hyattsville Middle School for the Creative and Performing Arts
- The Benjamin D. Foulois Creative and Performing Arts Academy

==== French Immersion ====
The French Immersion Magnet Program is designed for kindergarten through twelfth grade. It is referred to as a "full immersion program" as all academic subjects are taught through French, in grades K-5. In grades 6-8, the students have two periods per day of French, one period for French Language Arts and one period of world studies in French. In high school, students have two courses in grades 9 and 10 with a focus on literature and the francophone world, which are part of the Pre-International Baccalaureate (IB) Program. At the elementary level, students are immerse totally in French by their bilingual teachers, as they learn math, science, social studies and language arts.

At the middle school level, students also study Italian. In addition, Algebra and Geometry are possible options in mathematics. The interdisciplinary approach for English, Art and World Studies includes special themes, seminars, field trips, and a strong focus on essay writing. International travel is an enrichment part of the French Immersion Program.

At the high school level, students may take one of the immersion courses and the continuation of the second foreign language started at the middle school level. Other options are IB preparation courses for English, history, science, and access to Chemistry and Calculus. Higher level IB or Advanced Placement (AP) courses, are available. There is an Exchange Program with a school in France and other exchanges are being explored for high school students. In addition to the immersion continuity, students may continue the study of their second foreign language which began in middle school — either Russian, Italian, Latin, or German.

Locations:

- Maya Angelou French Immersion
- Dora Kennedy French Immersion
- Central High School

==== International Baccalaureate ====
The International Baccalaureate (IB) Diploma Magnet Program is a course of study. The mission of the program is to develop inquiring, knowledgeable, and caring young people who help to create a better, more peaceful world through intercultural understanding and respect.

The IB program offers many benefits to its participants, such as: higher university and college acceptance rates for IB graduates; increased scholarship and grant opportunities; a college-level academic program that transitions students to university and college standards; and teacher development using IB strategies.

Locations:

- Central High School
- Crossland High School
- Laurel High School
- Parkdale High School
- Suitland High School

==== Montessori ====
Prince George's County Public Schools has implemented two facilities dedicated to the Montessori instructional program — the Robert Goddard Montessori School and the John Hanson Montessori School. As dedicated facilities, these schools do not have a neighborhood attendance area. Entry into the program is through the random lottery application process only.

The Montessori Primary Program for children ages 3 to 6 years old is based on the Montessori educational philosophy. Taught by Montessori accredited teachers, young children are guided in developing an inner discipline, strengthening their coordination, and extending their concentration span. These accomplishments result with their readily learning to read, write and grasp mathematics. The program consists of a half-day morning for preschoolers (ages 3 ). Children older than four must be enrolled in a certified Montessori program to be accepted into the program.

The Montessori Lower Elementary Program is designed for students ages 6 to 9 years old with prior Montessori experience. Rapid growth and learning is observed in classrooms filled with appropriate educational materials. The Montessori Upper Elementary Program continues for the next age grouping of students ages 9–12 with prior Montessori experience. Taught by Montessori accredited teachers, these elementary program students study an integrated curriculum that includes: mathematics, geometry, language, cultural studies, astronomy, biology, chemistry, geography, history, geology, philosophy, art, music and physical education.

The Montessori Middle School Program completes the Montessori studies for students progressing to the seventh and eighth grades. An interdisciplinary teaching team provides the Montessori Program for multidisciplinary learning to include English Language Arts, mathematics, science and social studies. At the high school level, the student can apply for entry to Biotechnology, Biomedical, Military Academy, Center for the Visual & Performing Arts and/or the Science & Technology Center.

Locations:

- Robert Goddard Montessori School
- John Hanson Montessori School
- Judith P. Hoyer Montessori School

==== Science and Technology Center ====
The Science and Technology Center (S/T) is a highly challenging four-year curriculum which provides college-level academic experiences in science, mathematics, and technology. The program is not a true magnet program, as students are admitted into the S/T program based on competitive examination only, as opposed to the standard magnet lottery process. Of twenty-eight possible credits, a student is required to obtain a minimum of thirteen credits in specific mathematics, pre-engineering technology, research and science courses. In grades nine and ten, the program consists of common experiences courses for all student. In grades eleven and twelve, each student must choose course work from at least one of four major study areas. Students are expected to be enrolled in a full schedule of classes during the entire four-year program. External experiences are possible and encouraged, but must be a direct extension or enrichment of the Science and Technology Program, and have the recommendation of the Science and Technology Center Coordinator prior to approval by the principal.

The program is offered at three centers — Eleanor Roosevelt High School in northern Prince George's County, Oxon Hill High School in southern Prince George's County, and Charles Herbert Flowers High School in central Prince George's County. Students attend the center that serves their legal residence. Transportation is provided for all students. Each school is a four-year comprehensive high school, as well as a Science and Technology Center. Each school is an active member of the National Consortium for Specialized Secondary Schools of Mathematics, Science and Technology (NCSSSMST).

Admission into the Science and Technology Center is highly competitive and contingent upon three criterion, with all criterion weighed equally. The criterion are:

- Grades from four quarters of 7th grade and the first quarter of 8th grade (or four quarters of 8th grade and first quarter of 9th grade) in math, science, English, and social studies
- A standardized reading comprehension test
- A standardized numerical test

All of these are factored into a final score. The number of students admitted into the S/T program vary from each school, but as an example, 225-250 students with the top scores are admitted to Roosevelt's Science and Technology Program. The next 60 students are placed on a waiting list. All interested 8th and 9th grade students who are residents of Prince George's County are eligible to apply for admission to the Science and Technology Center.

===== Locations =====
- Charles Herbert Flowers High School
- Oxon Hill High School
- Eleanor Roosevelt High School

==== Spanish Dual Language Program ====
The Spanish Dual Language Program gives equal emphasis to English and non-English language speakers. Students learn Spanish and English through content based instruction in selected core subjects with a cross cultural understanding for both native and non-native speakers. Students read, write, listen and speak in both languages, becoming bilingual, biliterate and bicultural.

===== Locations =====
- Cesar Chavez Elementary School

==== Spanish Immersion ====
Language Immersion is an educational approach in which students are taught the curriculum content through the medium of a second language, Spanish. Children learn their entire core subjects (reading, writing, mathematics, social studies, and science) in Spanish. Spanish speaking teachers immerse student completely in Spanish as they learn. In this way, immersion students not only learn the content, but also gain knowledge of the language in which it is taught.

===== Locations =====
- Overlook Elementary School
- Phyllis E. Williams Elementary School

==== Talented and Gifted Center (TAG) ====
Talented and Gifted Center (TAG) Magnet Schools provide a full-day intensive educational program appropriate for identified talented and gifted students, in grades 2-8. Each school offers a full-day of enriched and accelerated educational experiences in the four major content areas. Special offerings include elementary foreign language programs, computer laboratories, laboratory based science program, and fine arts programs.

Locations:

- The Accokeek Academy
- Capitol Heights Elementary School
- Glenarden Woods Elementary School
- Heather Hills Elementary School
- Highland Park Elementary School
- Longfields Elementary School
- Valley View Elementary School
- Greenbelt Middle School
- Kenmoor Middle School
- Walker Mill Middle School

== See also ==
- List of Prince George's County Public Schools Middle Schools
- Prince George's County Public Schools Magnet Programs
- List of schools in Prince George's County, Maryland
