= White Hall, Prince George's County, Maryland =

Unincorporated community in Maryland, United States

White Hall, Maryland
- Unincorporated community
- Location within Maryland
- Coordinates: 38°41′10″N 76°59′20″W
- Country: United States of America
- State: Maryland
- County: Prince George's
- Elevation: 62 ft (19 m)
- Time zone: UTC-5 (Eastern (EST))
  - Summer (DST): UTC-4 (EDT)
- Area codes: 240 & 301
- GNIS feature ID: 598250

White Hall is an unincorporated community in Prince George's County, Maryland, United States. White Hall is located 2.5 miles (4.0 km) northeast of Accokeek.
