= Prince George's County, Maryland =

County in Maryland, United States

- County
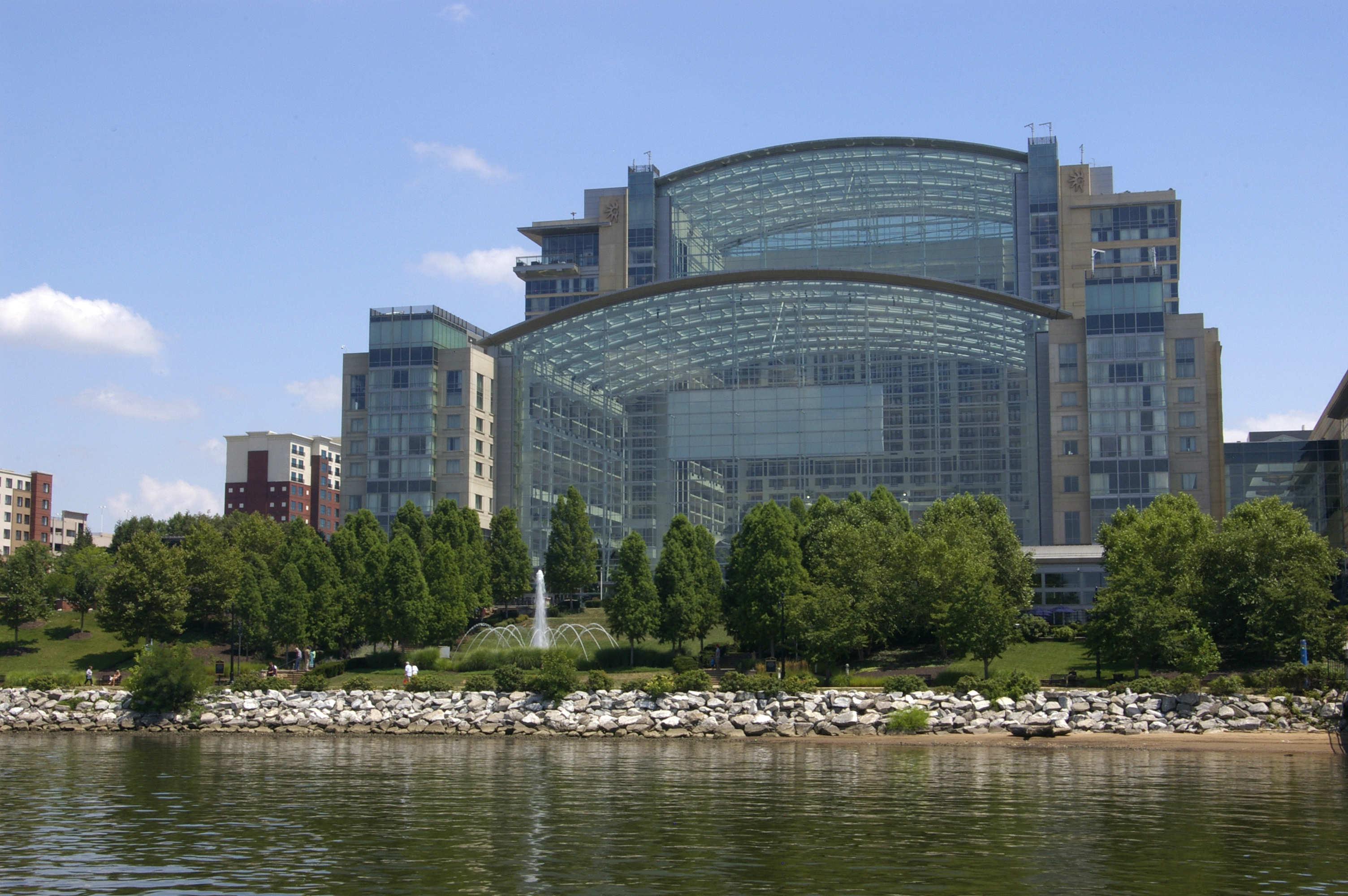
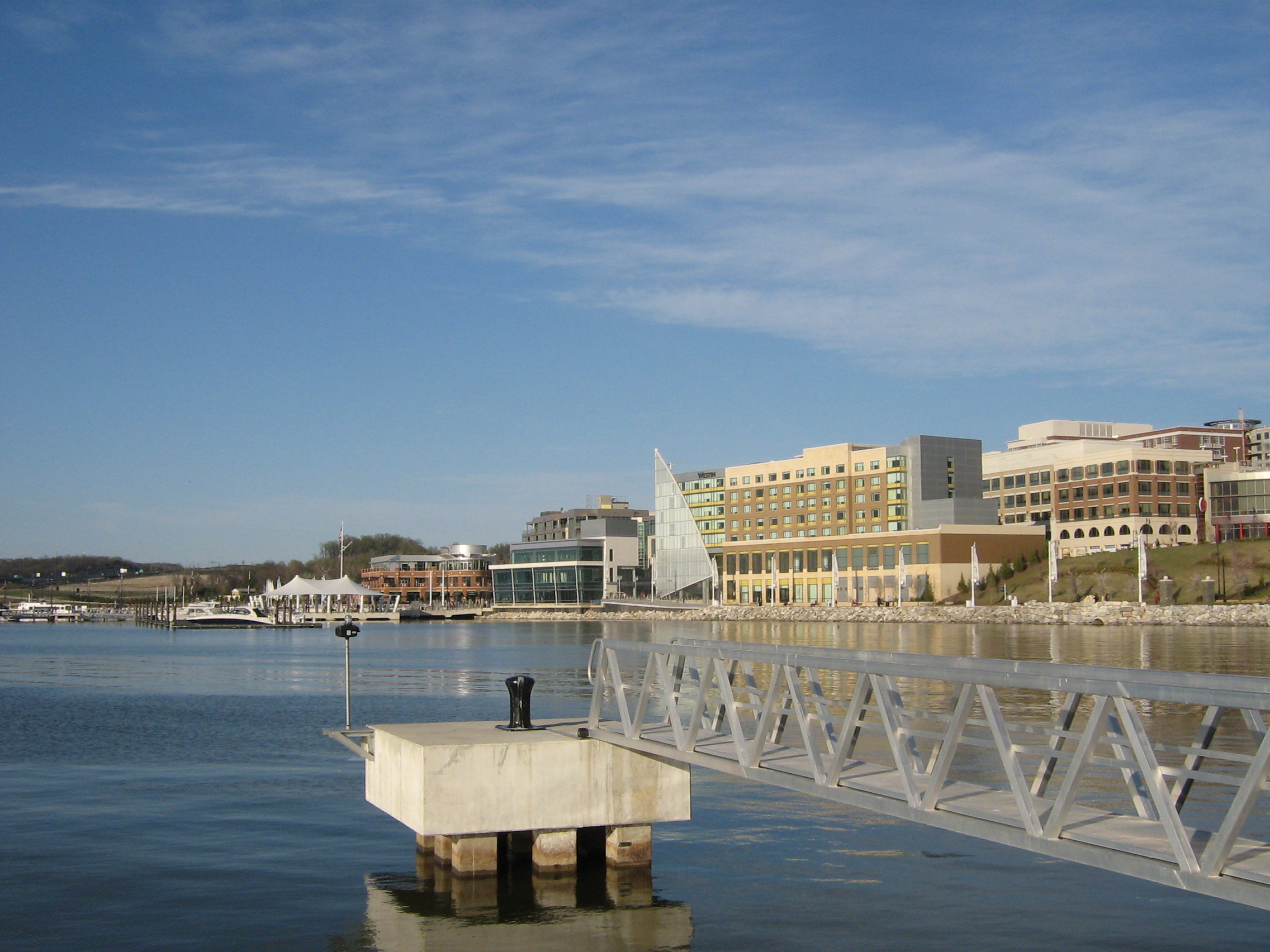
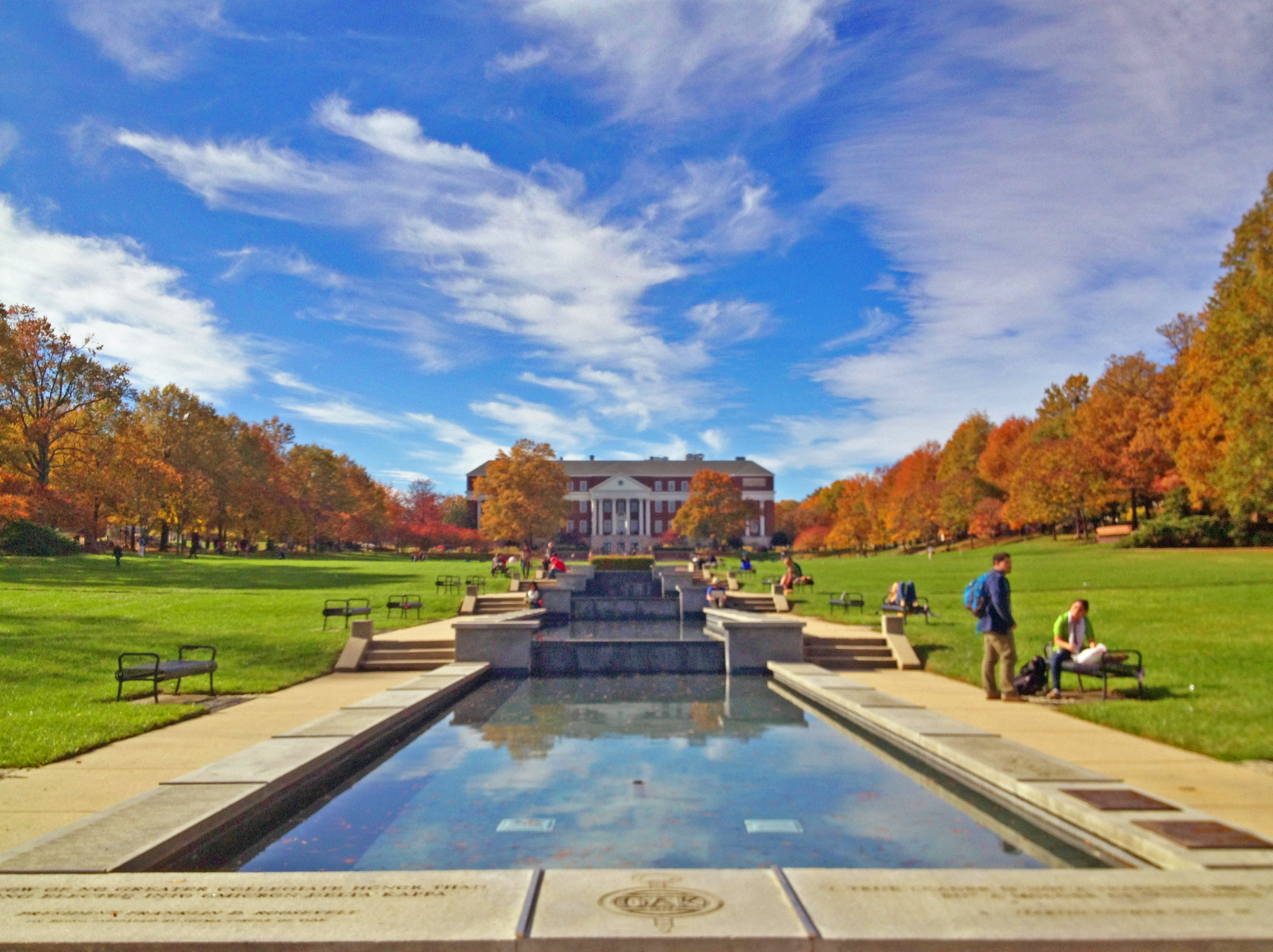
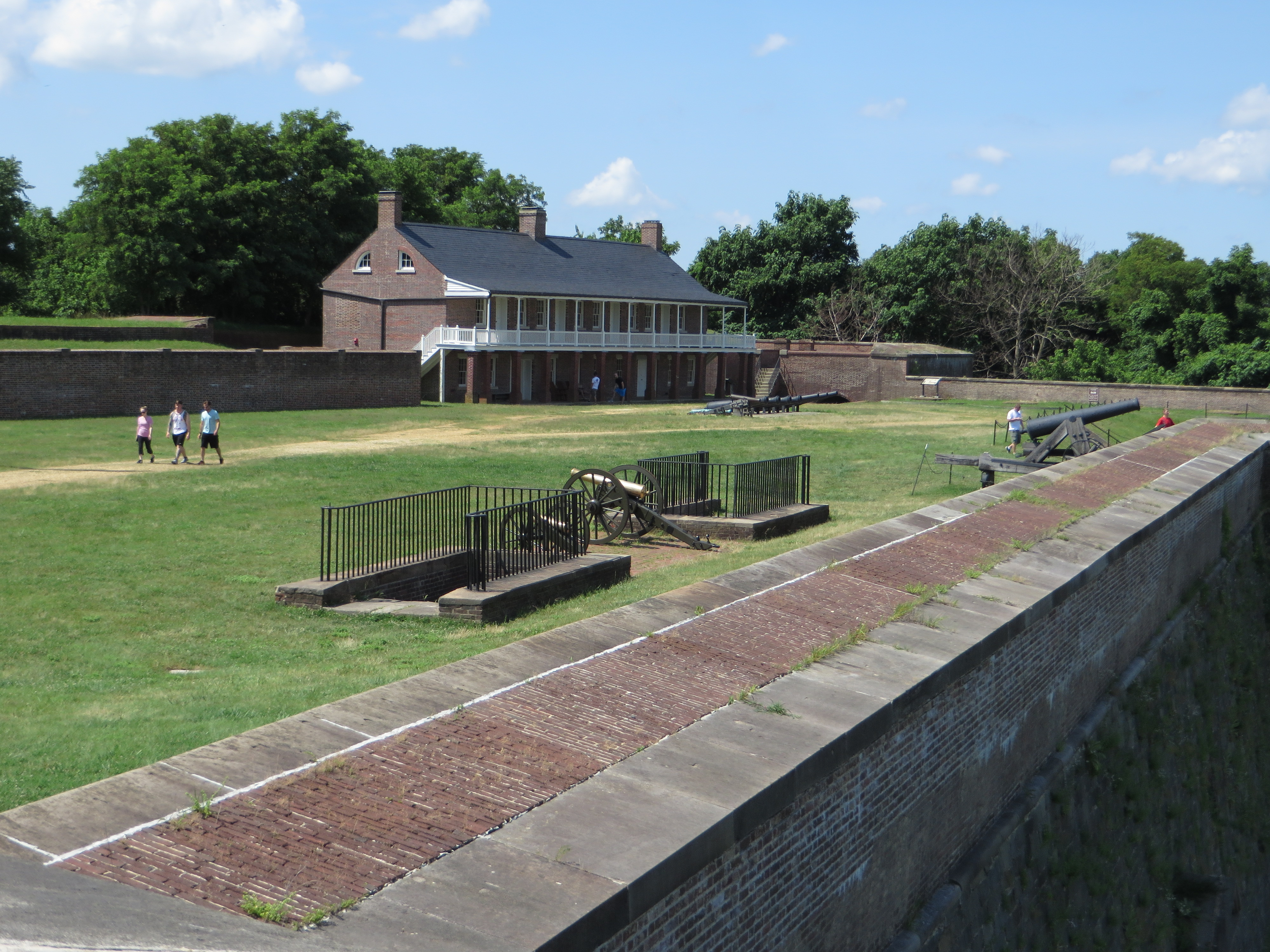
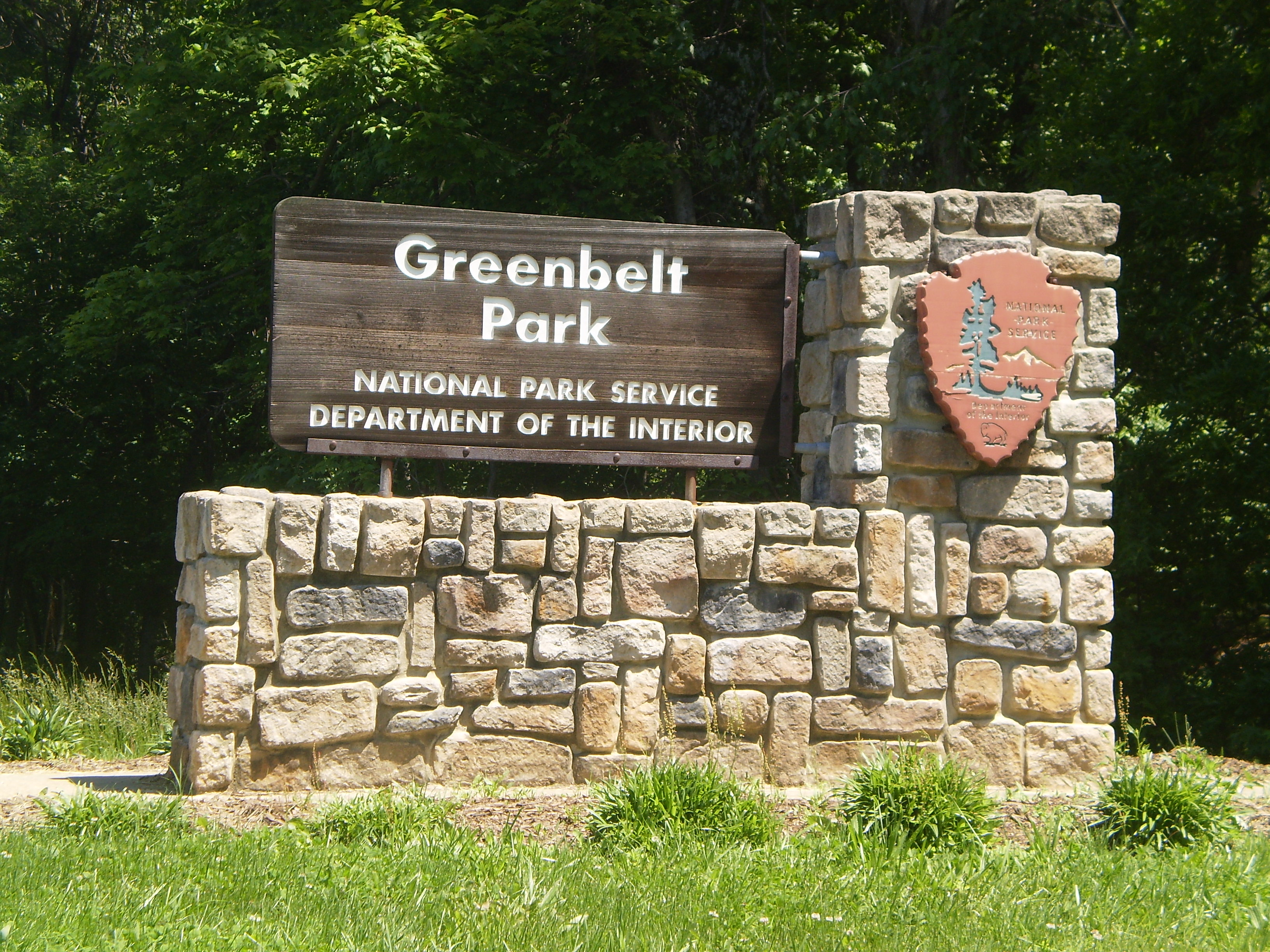
- Clockwise: Gaylord National Resort & Convention Center, McKeldin Mall at University of Maryland, College Park, Greenbelt Park, Fort Washington Park, National Harbor.

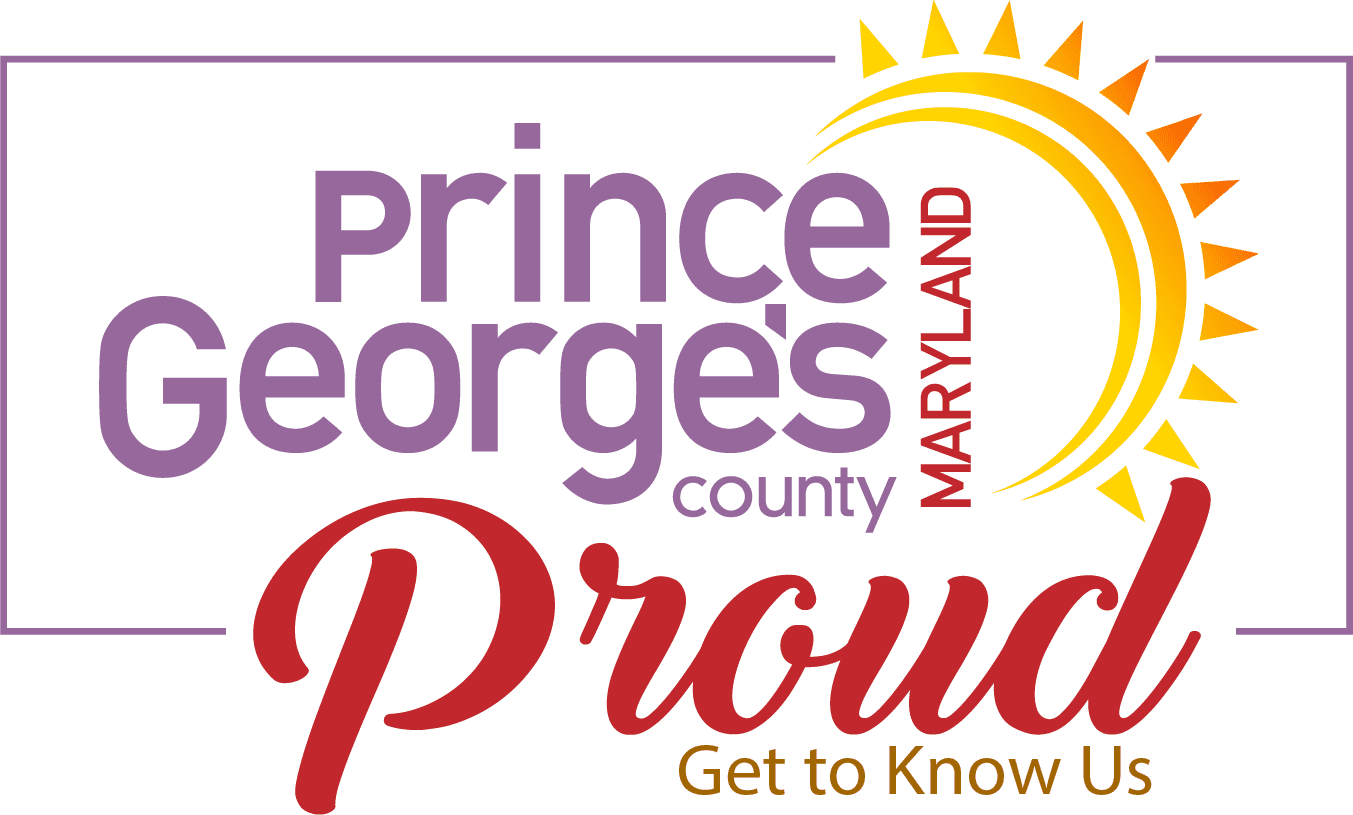
- Flag Seal Logo
- Nicknames: "PG County", "P.G."
- Motto: "Semper Eadem" (English: "Ever the Same")
- Location within the U.S. state of Maryland
- Coordinates: 38°50′N 76°51′W
- Country: United States
- State: Maryland
- Founded: April 23, 1696
- Named for: Prince George of Denmark
- Seat: Upper Marlboro
- Largest city: Bowie

Government
  - Executive: Aisha Braveboy

Area
  - Total: 499 sq mi (1,290 km^{2})
  - Land: 483 sq mi (1,250 km^{2})
  - Water: 16 sq mi (41 km^{2}) 3.2%

Population (2020)
  - Total: 967,201
  - Estimate (2025): 970,374 ▲
  - Density: 1,900/sq mi (730/km^{2})
- Demonym: Prince Georgian
- Time zone: UTC−5 (Eastern)
  - Summer (DST): UTC−4 (EDT)
- ZIP Codes: 20607–20774
- Area code: 240, 301
- Congressional districts: 4th, 5th, 8th
- Website: princegeorgescountymd.gov

Prince George's County (often shortened to PG County, PG, or PGC) is located in the U.S. state of Maryland bordering the eastern portion of Washington, D.C. As of the 2020 U.S. census, the population was 967,201, making it the second-most populous county in Maryland, behind neighboring Montgomery County. The 2020 census counted an increase of nearly 104,000 in the previous ten years. Its county seat is Upper Marlboro. It is the most populous African American-majority county in the United States, as well as the second most affluent behind neighboring Charles County.

The county is part of the Capital region of the state, though portions of the county are considered to be in Southern Maryland. The county also hosts many federal governmental facilities, such as Joint Base Andrews and the United States Census Bureau headquarters.

== Etymology ==
The official name of the county, as specified in the county's charter, is "Prince George's County, Maryland". The county is named after Prince George of Denmark (1653–1708), the consort of Anne, Queen of Great Britain, and the brother of King Christian V of Denmark and Norway. The county's demonym is Prince Georgian, and its motto is Semper Eadem (English: "Ever the Same"), a phrase used by Queen Anne. Prince George's County is frequently referred to as "PG" or "PG County", an abbreviation which is the subject of debate, some residents viewing it as a pejorative and others holding neutral feelings toward the term or even preferring the abbreviation over the full name.

== History ==
The flag of Prince George's County, from 1696 to 1963.

The official seal of Prince George's County, from 1958 to 1971. Note the lack of apostrophe in "GEORGES" and the spelling of "county" as "COVNTY".

The Cretaceous Era brought dinosaurs to the area that left fossils now preserved in a 7.5-acre (3.0 ha) park in Laurel. The site, which among other finds has yielded fossilized teeth from Astrodon and Priconodon species, has been called the most prolific in the eastern United States.

In the mid to late Holocene era, the area was occupied by Paleo-Native Americans and then, later, Native Americans. When the first European settlers arrived, what is now Prince George's County was inhabited by people of the Piscataway Indian Nation. Three branches of the tribe are still living today, two of which are headquartered in Prince George's County.

=== 17th century ===
Prince George's County was created by the English Council of Maryland in the Province of Maryland in April 1696 from portions of Charles and Calvert counties. The county was divided into six districts referred to as "Hundreds": Mattapany, Petuxant, Collington, Mount Calvert, Piscattoway and New Scotland.

=== 18th century ===
A portion was detached in 1748 to form Frederick County. Because Frederick County was subsequently divided to form the present Allegany, Garrett, Montgomery, and Washington counties, all of these counties in addition were derived from what had up to 1748 been Prince George's County.

In 1791, portions of Prince George's County were ceded to form the new District of Columbia (along with portions of Montgomery County, Maryland and parts of Northern Virginia that were later returned to Virginia).

=== 19th century ===
During the War of 1812, the British marched through the county by way of Bladensburg to burn the White House. On their return, they kidnapped a prominent doctor, William Beanes. Lawyer Francis Scott Key was asked to negotiate for his release, which resulted in his writing "The Star-Spangled Banner".

Prince George's County had the highest population of enslaved Africans within the state of Maryland. These people carried out forced labor on tobacco farms and plantations throughout Prince George's County.

During the Civil War, hundreds of enslaved black men in Prince George's County were given freedom in exchange for joining the Union Army and fighting in Colored units against Confederate forces. When Abraham Lincoln ordered the end of slavery in America, he did not free the slaves in Maryland because he was concerned that slave-owning Maryland would revolt, leaving Washington D.C. surrounded by Confederate forces. However John Pendleton Kennedy, a Maryland politician who became an abolitionist after watching a speech by Frederick Douglass, led a referendum campaign to end slavery in the state. In 1864, the citizens of Maryland voted to end slavery. However the state was so divided that the referendum won by only 1,000 votes. Lincoln then ordered the Union Army to enforce the ban in Maryland and all enslaved people in the state were freed.

After the Civil War, many African Americans attempted to become part of Maryland politics, but were met with violent repression after the fall of Reconstruction.

In April 1865, John Wilkes Booth made his escape through Prince George's County while en route to Virginia after killing President Abraham Lincoln.

=== 20th century ===
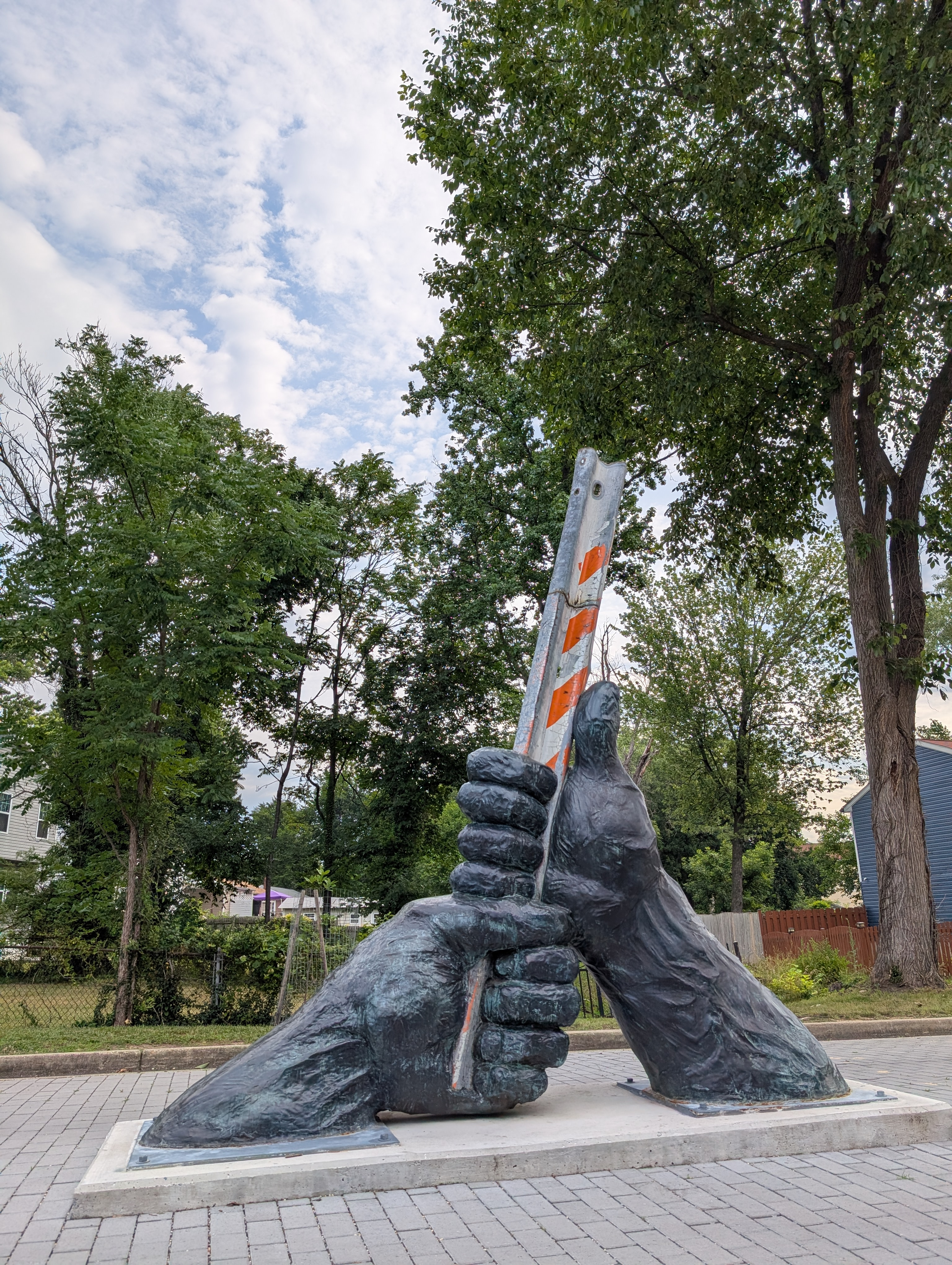
A sculpture on Windom Road, between the Prince George's towns of North Brentwood, a historically black municipality, and Brentwood, a sundown town, depicts two hands removing the original barrier between the municipalities.

The proportion of African Americans declined during the first half of the 20th century, but was renewed to over 50% in the early 1990s when the county again became majority African American. The first African American County Executive was Wayne K. Curry, elected in 1994.

On July 1, 1997, the Prince George's County section of the city of Takoma Park, which straddled the boundary between Prince George's and Montgomery counties, was transferred to Montgomery County. This was done after city residents voted in a referendum to be under the sole jurisdiction of Montgomery County, and subsequent approval by both counties and the Maryland General Assembly. This was the first change in Montgomery/Prince George's County line boundaries since 1968, when the City of Laurel was unified in Prince George's County; additional legislation was proposed in 1990 for a technical correction, though may not have achieved enactment.

=== 21st century ===
The county's population nearly reached one million residents in the 2020 census. It was the largest and highest-income black-majority county in the United States until the 2020 census, when it was surpassed by Charles County. Hispanic residents grew in number to 21% of the total population.

The county experienced a dramatic drop in crime, including record drops in violent crime, although in 2021 and 2022, violent crime increased by 30%. From 2020 to mid-2022 over 2,200 residents died of COVID-19, over 19,000 county residents were left with long-term post-COVID symptoms and over 193,000 COVID infections had been recorded.

== Geography ==
According to the U.S. Census Bureau, the county has a total area of 499 square miles (1,290 km^{2}), of which 483 square miles (1,250 km^{2}) is land and 16 square miles (41 km^{2}) (3.2%) is water.

Prince George's County lies in the Atlantic coastal plain, and its landscape is characterized by gently rolling hills and valleys. Along its western border with Montgomery County, Adelphi, Calverton and West Laurel rise into the piedmont, exceeding 300 feet (91 m) in elevation.

The Patuxent River forms the county's eastern border with Howard, Anne Arundel, Charles and Calvert counties.

=== Regions ===
The five regions of Prince George's County. = North County = Central County = Rural Tier = Inner Beltway = South County

Terrain, culture, and demographics differ significantly by location within the county. There are five key regions to Prince George's County: North County, Central County, the Rural Tier, the Inner Beltway, and South County. These regions are not formally defined, however, and the terms used to describe each area can vary greatly. In the broadest terms, the county is generally divided into North County and South County with U.S. Route 50 serving as the dividing line.

Southern Prince George's County is also considered to be a part of the Southern Maryland region.

==== North County ====
Northern Prince George's County includes Laurel, Beltsville, Adelphi, College Park and Greenbelt. This area of the county is anchored by the Capital Beltway and the Baltimore–Washington Parkway. Hyattsville developed early in the 20th century due to its proximity to rail transportation and U.S. Highway 1. Laurel is experiencing a population boom with the construction of the Inter-County Connector. The key employers in this region are the University of Maryland, Beltsville Agricultural Research Center, and NASA-Goddard Space Flight Center. Areas of geographic distinction include Greenbelt Park, a wooded reserve adjacent to the planned environmental community of Greenbelt, and University Park, a collection of historic homes adjacent to the University of Maryland. Riversdale Mansion, along with the historic homes of Berwyn Heights, Mt. Rainier and Hyattsville, along with Langley Park are also located in this area. Lake Artemesia and the surrounding park were constructed during the completion of the Washington Metro Green Line, and it incorporates a stocked fishing lake and serves as the trail-head for an extensive Anacostia Tributary Trails system that runs along the Anacostia River and its tributaries. The south and central tracts of the Patuxent Wildlife Research Center also lie in this part of the county; the north tract lies north of the Patuxent River in Anne Arundel County.

==== Central County ====
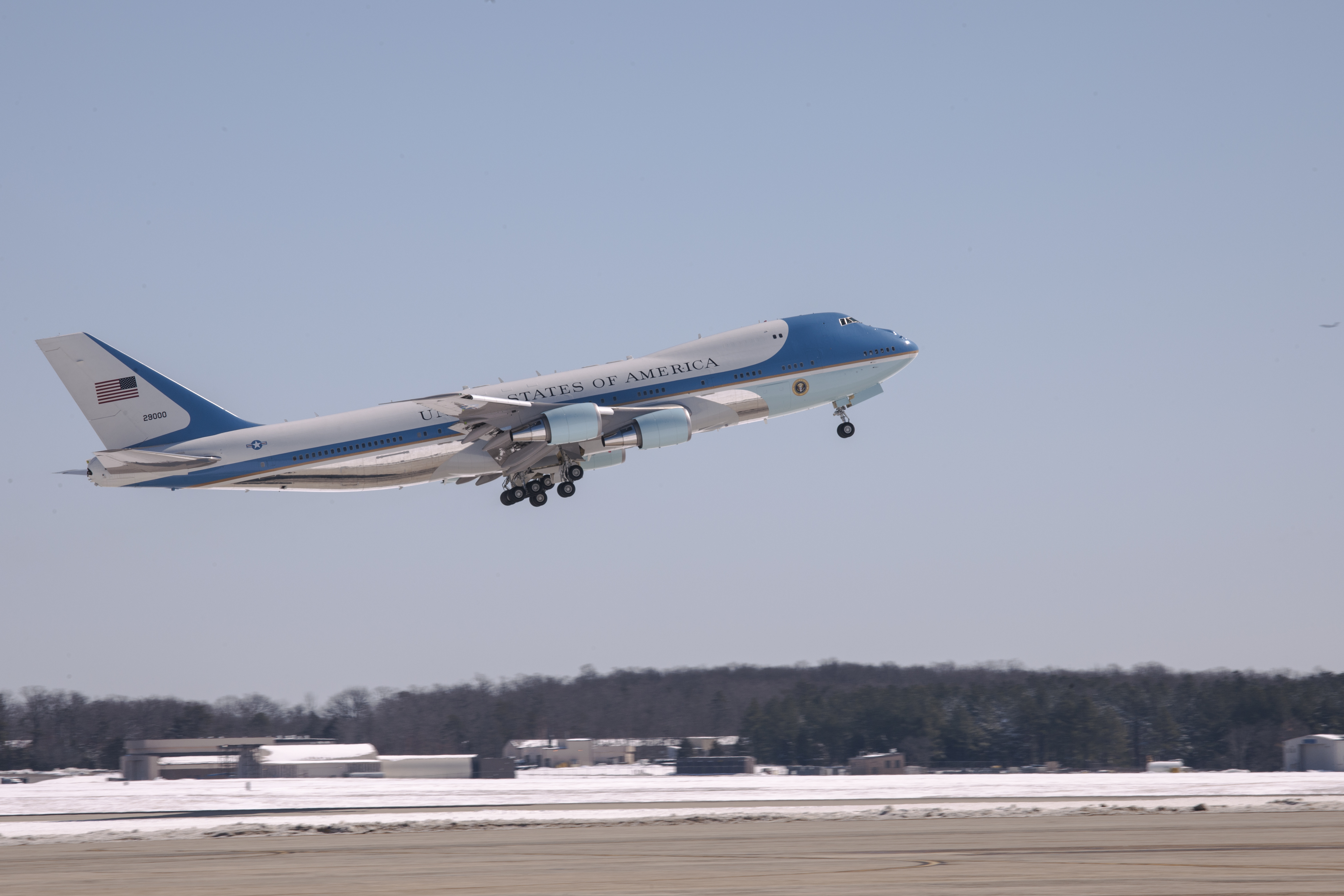
Air Force One departing from Andrews Air Force Base in Central County

Central County, located on the eastern outskirts of the Capital Beltway, consists of Mitchellville, Woodmore, Greater Upper Marlboro, Springdale, Largo, and Bowie. According to the 2010 census, it has generally been the fastest growing region of the county. Mitchellville is named for a wealthy family, the Mitchells, who owned a large portion of land in this area of the county. Central Avenue, a major exit off the I-95 beltway, running east to west, is one of two main roads in this portion of the county. The other major roadway is Old Crain Highway, which runs north to south along the eastern portion of the county. The Newton White Mansion on the grounds is a popular site for weddings and political events. Joint Base Andrews, Bowie State University and Prince George's Community College are in the Central region, as well as County government offices.

Bowie is best known as a planned Levittown. William Levitt in the 1960s built traditional homes, as well as California contemporaries along U.S. Route 50, the key highway to the eastern shore and the state capital of Annapolis. Bowie has currently grown to be the largest city in Prince George's County, with more than 50,000 people. It also has a large Caucasian population, compared to much of the county (48% of the population). Housing styles vary from the most contemporary to century-old homes in Bowie's antique district (formerly known as Huntingtown), where the town of Bowie began as a haven for thoroughbred horse racing. Areas of geographic distinction include the Oden Bowie Mansion, Allen Pond, key segments of the Washington, Baltimore and Annapolis Trail, as well as planned parks, lakes and walking trails.

==== Inner Beltway ====
The inner beltway communities of Capitol Heights, District Heights, Fairmont Heights, Forestville, Suitland, Hillcrest Heights, Oxon Hill, and Seat Pleasant border neighboring District of Columbia's northeastern and southeastern quadrants. The area has easy access to Metro's Blue, Silver or Green Lines, commercial centers, Maryland Route 214, and Interstate 95/Interstate 495 (Capital Beltway). Protected bike trails connect residents to the Bladensburg waterfront, Kenilworth parks, and downtown D.C. Fairmont Heights is the second oldest African-American-majority municipality in Prince George's County. The Fairmount Heights Historic District was added to the National Register of Historic Places in 2011.

==== Rural Tier ====
Prince George's rural tier was designated "in the 2002 General Plan as an area where residential growth would be minimal"; it may be found in the area just beyond the Beltway to the west and south of central county, though with direct access by Route 210, while bounded on the west by the communities Accokeek and Fort Washington, and the east by the Patuxent River. Prince George's origins are in this part of the county. Most of this area contains the unincorporated parishes, villages and lost towns of Prince George's County. Largely under postal designations of "Upper Marlboro" or "Brandywine", in truth the town of Upper Marlboro is more central county in character, though it is the post office location for various rural settlements. (The names of these unincorporated areas are listed below in the towns section of this article). Since 1721 Upper Marlboro has been the county seat of government, with families that trace their lineage back to Prince George's initial land grants and earliest governing officials. Names like Clagett, Sasscer, King James and Queen Anne pepper the streets.

The rural tier has been the focus of orchestrated efforts by residents and county government to preserve its rural character and environmental integrity. Under the Maryland-National Capital Park and Planning Commission (M-NCPPC), Patuxent River Park is the largest natural preserve and provides public access for birdwatching and viewing the rural tier's natural waterfront vistas. In season, the park's Jug Bay Natural Area and the Patuxent Riverkeeper in Queen Anne both offer canoeing and kayaking rentals on the Patuxent. The county's largest collection of tobacco planter mansions and preserved homes are in the rural tier, some managed by the M-NCPPC. Many rural tier roads have scenic highway preservation status. Rosaryville State Park is in the county, not far from the county seat.

==== South County ====
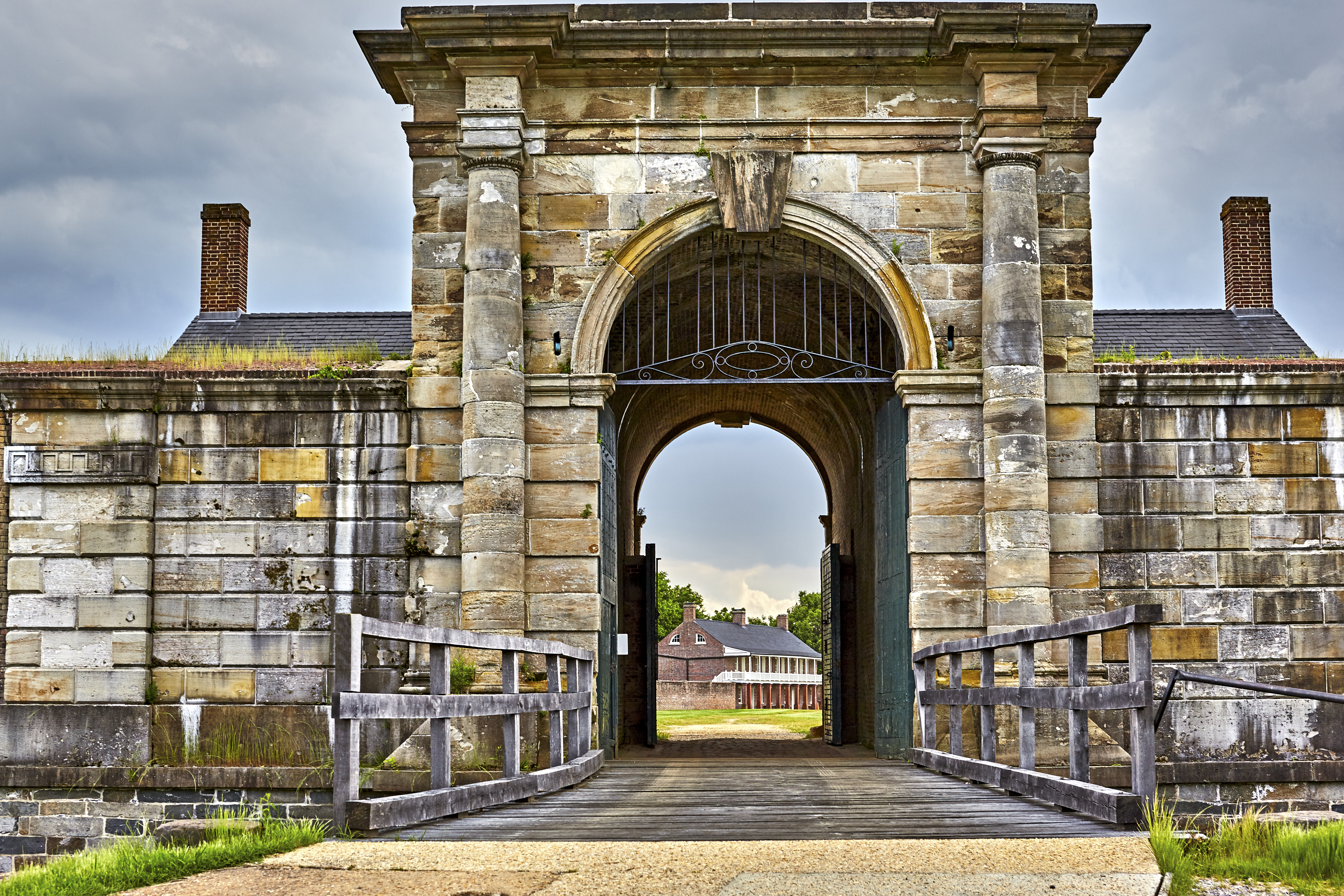
The entrance to the 19th century Fort Washington, built to protect Washington, DC from seaborne attack up the Potomac River

South County is a blend of the greenery of the rural tier and the new development of central county. The communities of Clinton, Oxon Hill, Temple Hills including Hillcrest Heights, and Fort Washington are the largest areas of south county. It is the only portion of Prince George's County to enjoy the Potomac River waterfront, and that geographic distinction has yielded the rise of the National Harbor project: a town center and riverside shopping and living development on the Potomac. The National Harbor, and its associated entertainment (MGM National Harbor) and shopping (Tanger Outlets) districts, have become a major tourist and convention attraction, with significant hotel accommodations, eateries and shopping. Together, these projects were built on land formerly occupied by the Salubria plantation, where a 14-year-old slave girl poisoned her owner, John H. Bayne, and his family in 1831. Water taxi service connects National Harbor to other destinations along the Potomac. Several historic sites, including Jones Point Lighthouse, can be viewed from the harbor front. Piscataway Park in Accokeek preserves many acres of woodland and wetlands along the Potomac River opposite Mount Vernon, Virginia. River Road in Fort Washington also yields great views of the Potomac. Fort Washington Park was a major battery and gives access to the public for tours of the fort, scenic access to the river and other picnic grounds. Oxon Hill Manor offers a working farm and plantation mansion for touring; His Lordship's Kindness is another major historic home. Also, Fort Foote is an old American Civil War fort and tourist destination.

=== Adjacent counties and independent cities ===
- Anne Arundel County (east)
- Calvert County (southeast)
- Charles County (south)
- Howard County (north)
- Montgomery County (northwest)
- Fairfax County, Virginia (southwest)
- Alexandria, Virginia (southwest)
- Washington, D.C. (west)

Prince George's and Montgomery Counties share a bi-county planning and parks agency in the M-NCPPC and a public bi-county water and sewer utility in the Washington Suburban Sanitary Commission

=== National protected areas ===
- Fort Washington Park
- Greenbelt Park
- Patuxent Wildlife Research Refuge (part)
- Piscataway Park
- Cedarville State Forest (whose main entrance is in Prince George's County)

== Politics and government ==
Since 1792, the county seat has been Upper Marlboro. Prior to 1792, the county seat was located at Mount Calvert, a 76-acre (308,000 m^{2}) estate along the Patuxent River on the edge of what is now in the unincorporated community of Croom. Since 1991, the county has slowly moved government functions from rural Upper Marlboro to the Largo area, closer to the center of population, while proposals to move the actual county seat remain controversial.

Prince George's County was granted a charter form of government in 1970 with the county executive elected as the head of the executive branch and the county council members as the leadership of the legislative branch. The county is divided into nine councilmanic districts, whose number designations wind roughly from north to south. Two at-large council seats were added in 2018. Prince George's County is part of the Seventh Judicial Circuit of the state of Maryland and holds 23 of the 32 total circuit court judges in the circuit (which includes Calvert, Charles, Prince George's, and St. Mary's counties).

Fitch Ratings assigned a 'AAA' bond rating to Prince George's County on August 25, 2011, re-affirming the county's stable financial outlook. Earlier in 2011, the county received 'AAA' status from Standard & Poor's and Moody's. 'AAA' bond ratings are the highest possible bond ratings a jurisdiction can receive.

As part of the increasingly liberal D.C. suburbs and a nationwide suburban shift towards the Democrats, Prince George's County is a Democratic stronghold, having voted majority-Democratic in every presidential election but four since 1932: Dwight D. Eisenhower's landslide elections in 1952 and 1956, and Richard Nixon's two candidacies in 1968 and 1972. It has not given over 15% of the vote to the Republican nominee since 2004, and was Joe Biden's second strongest county in the country (and third-best county equivalent after Washington, D.C.) in the 2020 presidential election, only behind Kalawao County, Hawaii, awarding him 89.26% of the vote, and Kamala Harris's strongest county (again, after Washington DC) in the 2024 presidential election, awarding her 85.9% of the vote.

=== Voter registration ===
Voter registration and party enrollment as of March 2024
Democratic	454,311	75.16%
Unaffiliated	97,563	16.14%
Republican	38,492	6.37%
Libertarian	1,534	0.25%
Other parties	12,577	2.08%
Total	604,477	100%

United States presidential election results for Prince George's County, Maryland
Year	Republican		Democratic		Third party(ies)	
Year	No.	%	No.	%	No.	%
1892	2,423	47.31%	2,655	51.85%	43	0.84%
1896	3,250	55.94%	2,505	43.12%	55	0.95%
1900	3,455	55.02%	2,787	44.39%	37	0.59%
1904	2,845	55.36%	2,270	44.17%	24	0.47%
1908	2,639	48.90%	2,680	49.66%	78	1.45%
1912	1,456	27.26%	2,424	45.38%	1,461	27.35%
1916	3,058	45.41%	3,493	51.87%	183	2.72%
1920	6,628	56.83%	4,857	41.64%	178	1.53%
1924	5,868	46.98%	5,088	40.74%	1,534	12.28%
1928	9,782	59.06%	6,658	40.20%	122	0.74%
1932	6,696	36.09%	11,580	62.41%	280	1.51%
1936	8,107	34.80%	15,087	64.76%	101	0.43%
1940	9,523	36.28%	16,592	63.21%	136	0.52%
1944	13,750	49.54%	14,006	50.46%	0	0.00%
1948	14,718	49.02%	14,874	49.54%	432	1.44%
1952	38,060	56.30%	29,119	43.07%	423	0.63%
1956	40,654	50.86%	39,280	49.14%	0	0.00%
1960	44,817	41.95%	62,013	58.05%	0	0.00%
1964	46,413	36.20%	81,806	63.80%	0	0.00%
1968	73,269	41.24%	71,524	40.26%	32,867	18.50%
1972	116,166	58.55%	79,914	40.28%	2,330	1.17%
1976	81,027	42.03%	111,743	57.97%	0	0.00%
1980	78,977	40.71%	98,757	50.91%	16,253	8.38%
1984	95,121	40.96%	136,063	58.59%	1,036	0.45%
1988	86,545	38.83%	133,816	60.04%	2,520	1.13%
1992	62,955	24.51%	168,691	65.67%	25,213	9.82%
1996	52,697	21.93%	176,612	73.50%	10,993	4.57%
2000	49,987	18.38%	216,119	79.48%	5,803	2.13%
2004	55,532	17.44%	260,532	81.81%	2,410	0.76%
2008	38,833	10.38%	332,396	88.87%	2,797	0.75%
2012	35,734	9.22%	347,938	89.73%	4,072	1.05%
2016	32,811	8.40%	344,049	88.13%	13,525	3.46%
2020	37,090	8.73%	379,208	89.26%	8,557	2.01%
2024	45,008	11.14%	347,038	85.90%	11,963	2.96%

=== County executive and council ===
County Executive (history)
Name	Party	Term
William W. Gullett	Republican	1970–1974
Win Kelly	Democratic	1974–1978
Lawrence Hogan	Republican	1978–1982
Parris Glendening	Democratic	1982–1994
Wayne K. Curry	Democratic	1994–2002
Jack B. Johnson	Democratic	2002–2010
Rushern L. Baker III	Democratic	2010–2018
Angela D. Alsobrooks	Democratic	2018–2024
Tara Jackson (acting)	Democratic	2024–2025
Aisha Braveboy	Democratic	2025–present

County Council (current)
Name	Party	District
Tom Dernoga	Democratic	1
Wanika Fisher	Democratic	2
Eric Olson	Democratic	3
Tim Adams	Democratic	4
Shayla Adams-Stafford	Democratic	5
Danielle Hunter	Democratic	6
Krystal Oriadha (Vice Chair)	Democratic	7
Edward Burroughs III (Chair)	Democratic	8
Sydney Harrison	Democratic	9
Jolene Ivey	Democratic	At-large
Wala Blegay	Democratic	At-large

=== Other officials ===
- State's Attorney: Tara Jackson (acting) (D)
- County Sheriff: John D. B. Carr (D)
- County Fire Chief: Tiffany D. Green
- Clerk of the Circuit Court: Mahasin El Amin
- Chief of the County Police: Malik Aziz
- PGCPS Chief Executive Officer: Monica Goldson

=== Emergency services ===
==== Law enforcement ====
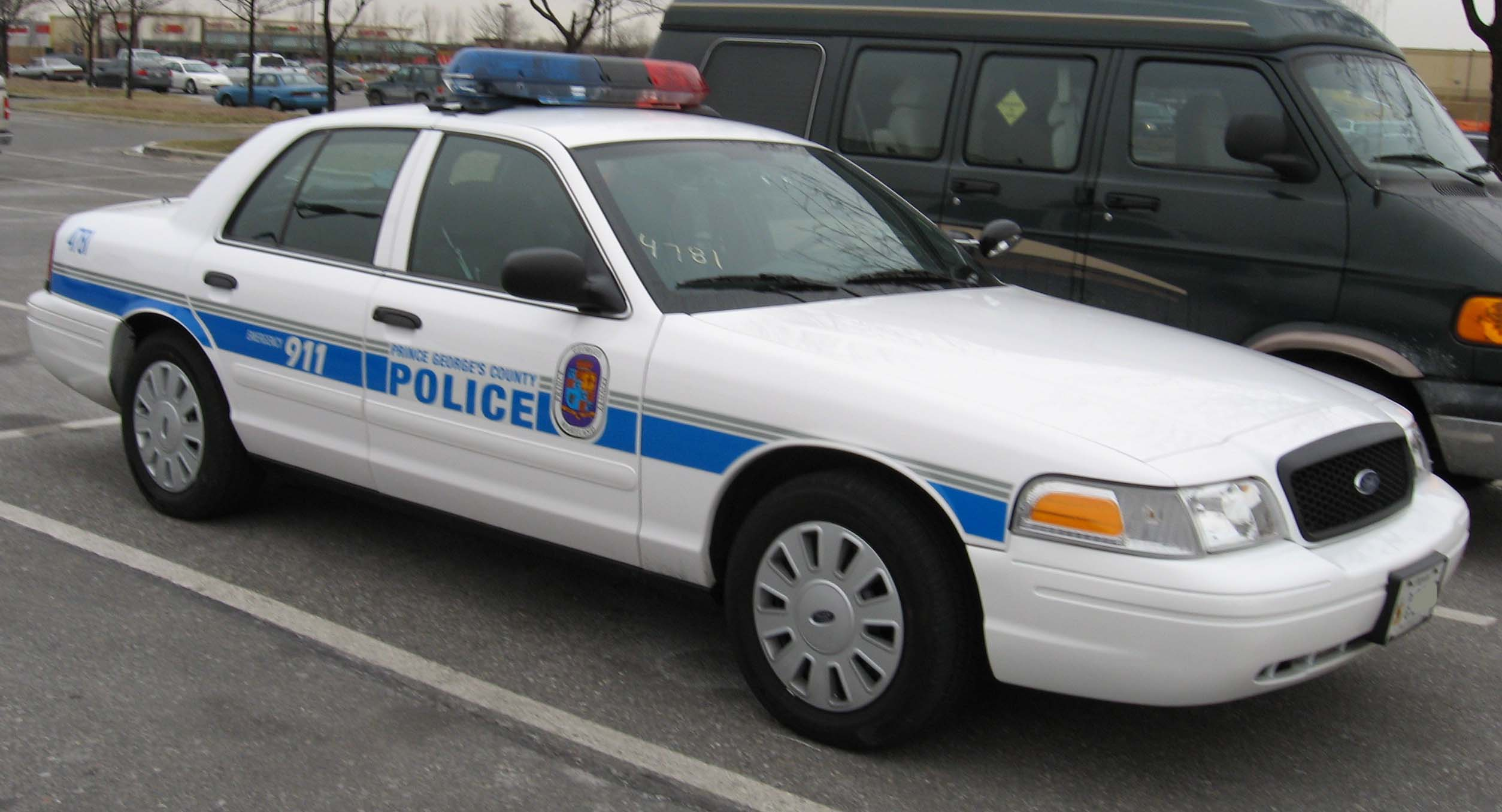
A marked Ford Crown Victoria Police Interceptor of the Prince George's County Police Department in February 2007

Prince George's County is serviced by multiple law enforcement agencies. The Prince George's County Police Department is the primary police service for county residents residing in unincorporated areas of the county. In addition, the Prince George's County Sheriff's Office acts as the enforcement arm of the county court, and also shares some patrol responsibility with the county police. County parks are serviced by the Prince George's County Division of the Maryland-National Capital Park Police. Besides the county-level services, all but one of the 27 local municipalities maintain police departments that share jurisdiction with the county police services. Furthermore, the Maryland State Police enforces the law on state highways which pass through the county with the exception of Maryland Route 200 where the Maryland Transportation Authority Police is the primary law enforcement agency and the Maryland Department of Natural Resources Police patrol the state parks and navigable waterways located within the county.

Along with the state and local law enforcement agencies, the federal government also maintains several departments that service citizens of the county such as the US Park Police, US Postal Police, the 316th Security Forces Squadron (specifically covering Andrews AFB), and other federal police located on various federal property within the county.

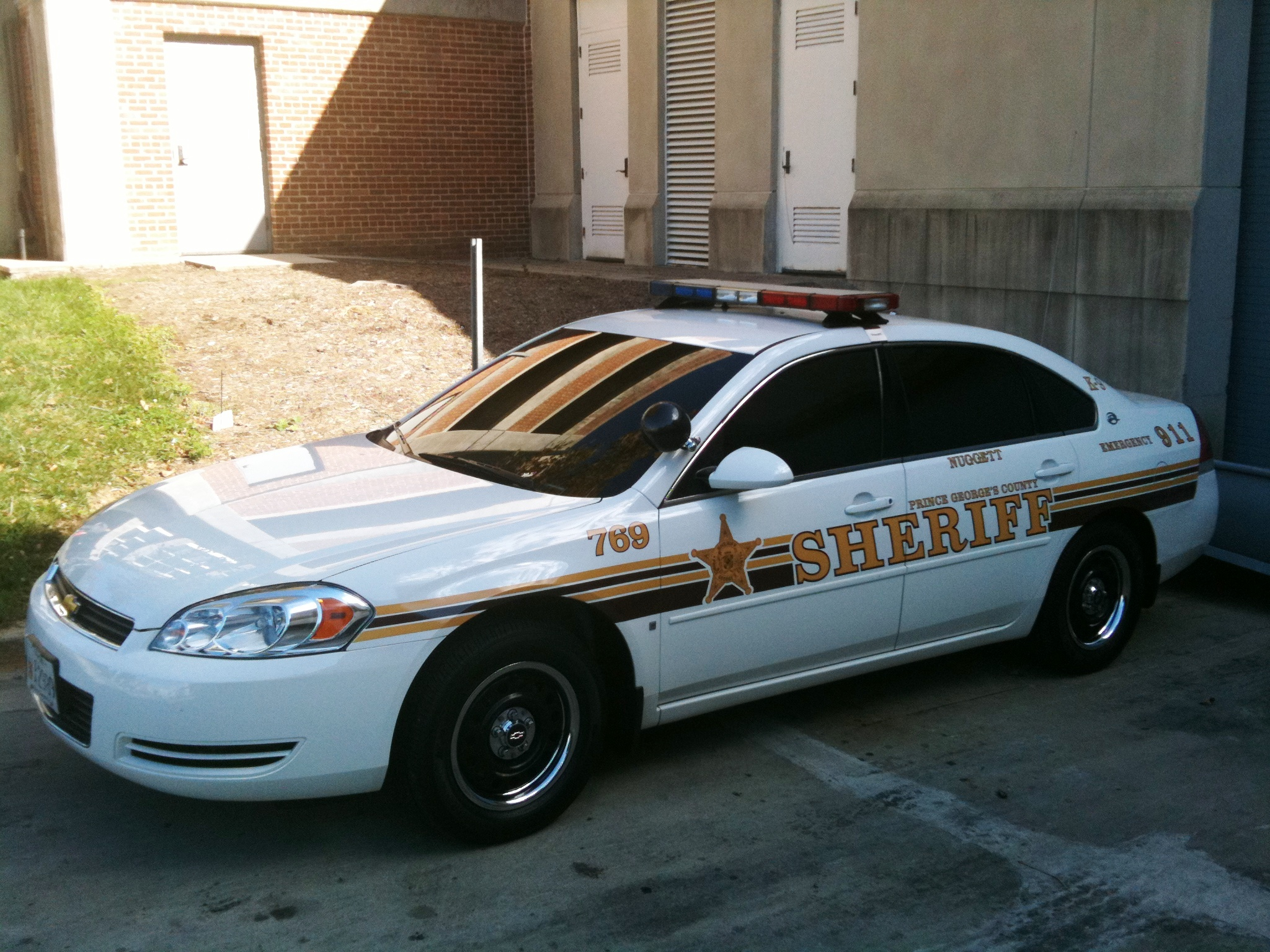
K9 cruiser of the Prince George's County Sheriff's Office in October 2009

In addition, nearly all of the incorporated cities and towns in the county have their own municipal police force. Notable exceptions include the city of College Park.

==== Other emergency services ====
Prince George's County hospitals include Bowie Health Center, Doctors Community Hospital in Lanham, Gladys Spellman Specialty Hospital & Nursing Center in Cheverly, Laurel Regional Hospital in Laurel, Southern Maryland Hospital Center in Clinton, University of Maryland Capital Region Medical Center, a state-of-the-art acute care teaching hospital, and Fort Washington Medical Center. Hospice of the Chesapeake has offices in Largo, with a staff that serves patients in their homes, including skilled nursing, senior living and assisted living facilities.

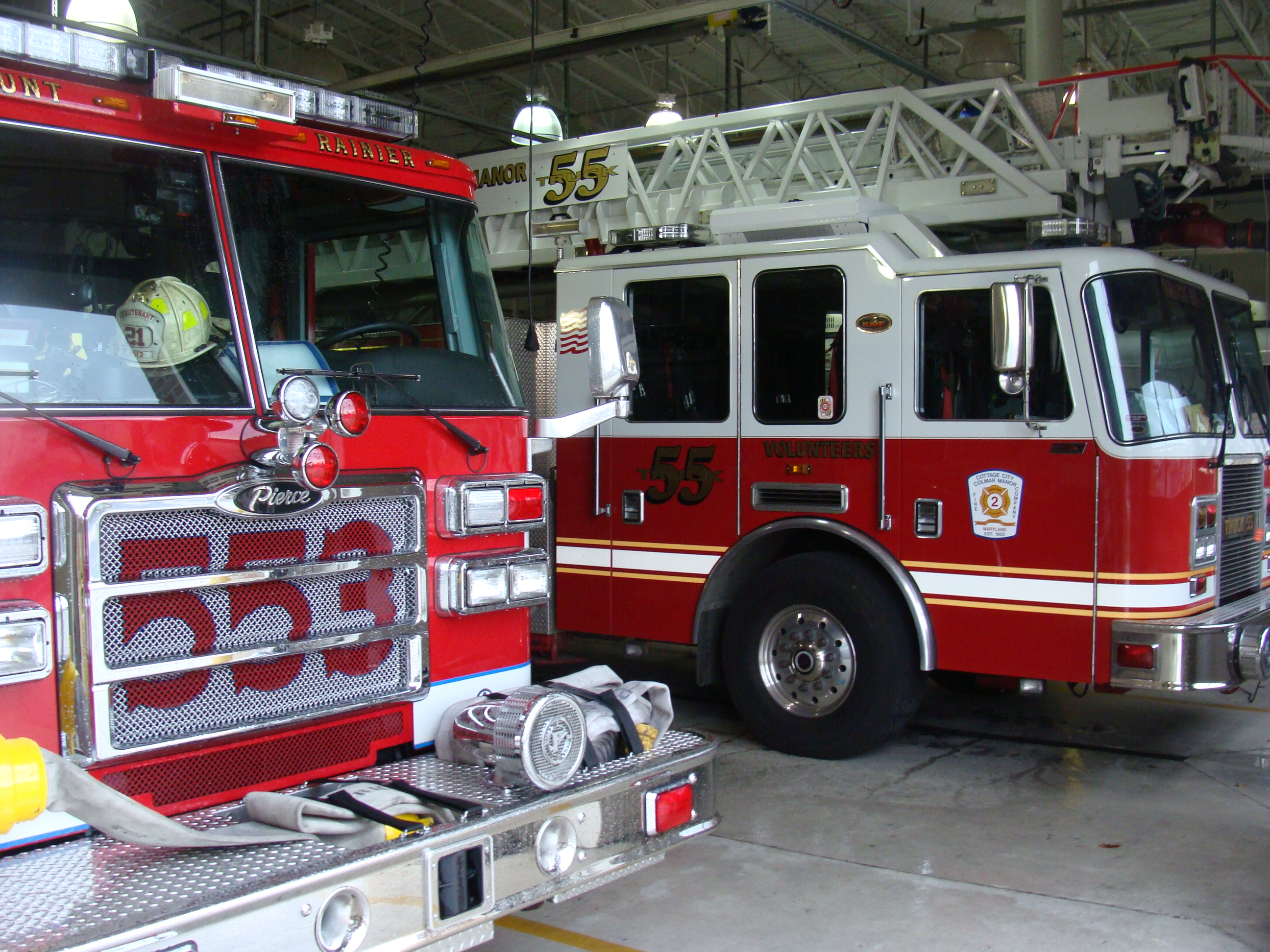
Engine 553 in the foreground, Ladder 55 in the background

The Prince George's County Volunteer Firemen's Association was formed in 1922 with several of the first companies organized in the county. The first members of the association were Hyattsville, Cottage City, Mount Rainier, and Brentwood.

In March 1966, the Prince George's County Government employed the firefighters who had been hired by individual volunteer stations and an organized career department was begun. The career firefighters and paramedics are represented by IAFF 1619. Prince George's County Fire/Rescue Operations consists of 45 Fire/EMS stations.

Prince George's County became the first jurisdiction in Maryland to implement the 9-1-1 Emergency Reporting System in 1973. Advanced life support services began for citizens of the county in 1977. Firefighters were certified as Cardiac Rescue Technicians and deployed in what was called at the time Mobile Intensive Care Units to fire stations in Brentwood, Silver Hill, and Laurel.

As of 2007, the Prince George's County Fire/EMS Department operates a combination system staffed by over 800 career firefighters and paramedics, and nearly 1,100 active volunteers.

County law has, for years, required Animal Control to seize all pit bulls from their owners if they become aware of them. This is controversial and Animal Control itself objects to this law. It has routinely required them to act when they see such a dog behaving peacefully inside of a private home merely because Animal Control is checking something unrelated.

=== State representation ===
The Prince George's County Delegation represents the county via 23 delegates in the Maryland House of Delegates, including Joseline Peña-Melnyk, the speaker of the Maryland House of Delegates. Eight senators represent the county in the Maryland State Senate.

==== House of Delegates ====
District	Counties represented	Delegate	Party	First elected	Committee
21	Anne Arundel, Prince George's	Mary A. Lehman	Democratic	2018	Government, Labor, and Elections
21	Anne Arundel, Prince George's	Ben Barnes	Democratic	2006	Appropriations (Chair)
21	Anne Arundel, Prince George's	Joseline Peña-Melnyk	Democratic	2006	Speaker
22	Prince George's	Ashanti Martinez	Democratic	2023 (appointed)	Health
22	Prince George's	Anne Healey	Democratic	1990	Environment and Transportation
22	Prince George's	Nicole A. Williams	Democratic	2019 (appointed)	Judiciary
23	Prince George's	Adrian Boafo	Democratic	2022	Economic Matters
23	Prince George's	Kym Taylor	Democratic	2022	Judiciary
23	Prince George's	Marvin E. Holmes, Jr.	Democratic	2002	Environment and Transportation
24	Prince George's	Andrea Harrison	Democratic	2018	Appropriations
24	Prince George's	Tiffany T. Alston	Democratic	2022	Health
24	Prince George's	Derrick Coley	Democratic	2026 (appointed)	
25	Prince George's	Kent Roberson	Democratic	2023 (appointed)	Ways and Means
25	Prince George's	Denise Roberts	Democratic	2024 (appointed)	Economic Matters
25	Prince George's	Karen Toles	Democratic	2022 (appointed)	Appropriations
26	Prince George's	Kris Valderrama	Democratic	2006	Economic Matters (chair)
26	Prince George's	Jamila Woods	Democratic	2022	Judiciary
26	Prince George's	Veronica L. Turner	Democratic	2018	Economic Matters
27A	Charles, Prince George's	Darrell Odom	Democratic	2026 (appointed)	
27B	Calvert, Prince George's	Jeffrie Long Jr.	Democratic	2022	Environment and Transportation
47A	Prince George's	Diana M. Fennell	Democratic	2014	Economic Matters
47A	Prince George's	Julian Ivey	Democratic	2018	Appropriations
47B	Prince George's	Deni Taveras	Democratic	2022	Health

==== State Senate ====
District	Senator	Party	Since	Residence	Counties represented
21	James Rosapepe	Democratic	2007	College Park	Anne Arundel, Prince George's
22	Alonzo T. Washington	Democratic	2023	Greenbelt	Prince George's
23	Ron Watson	Democratic	2021	Upper Marlboro	Prince George's
24	Joanne C. Benson	Democratic	2011	Landover	Prince George's
25	Nick Charles	Democratic	2023	Forestville	Prince George's
26	C. Anthony Muse	Democratic	2023	Accokeek	Prince George's
27	Kevin Harris	Democratic	2021	Brandywine	Calvert, Charles, Prince George's
47	Malcolm Augustine	Democratic	2019	Cheverly	Prince George's

=== Federal representation ===
In the 118th Congress, most of Prince George's County is represented in the U.S. House of Representatives by Glenn Ivey (D) of the 4th district and Steny Hoyer (D) of the 5th district. A small part of the northwestern portion of the county is represented by Jamie Raskin (D) of the 8th district.

== Transportation ==
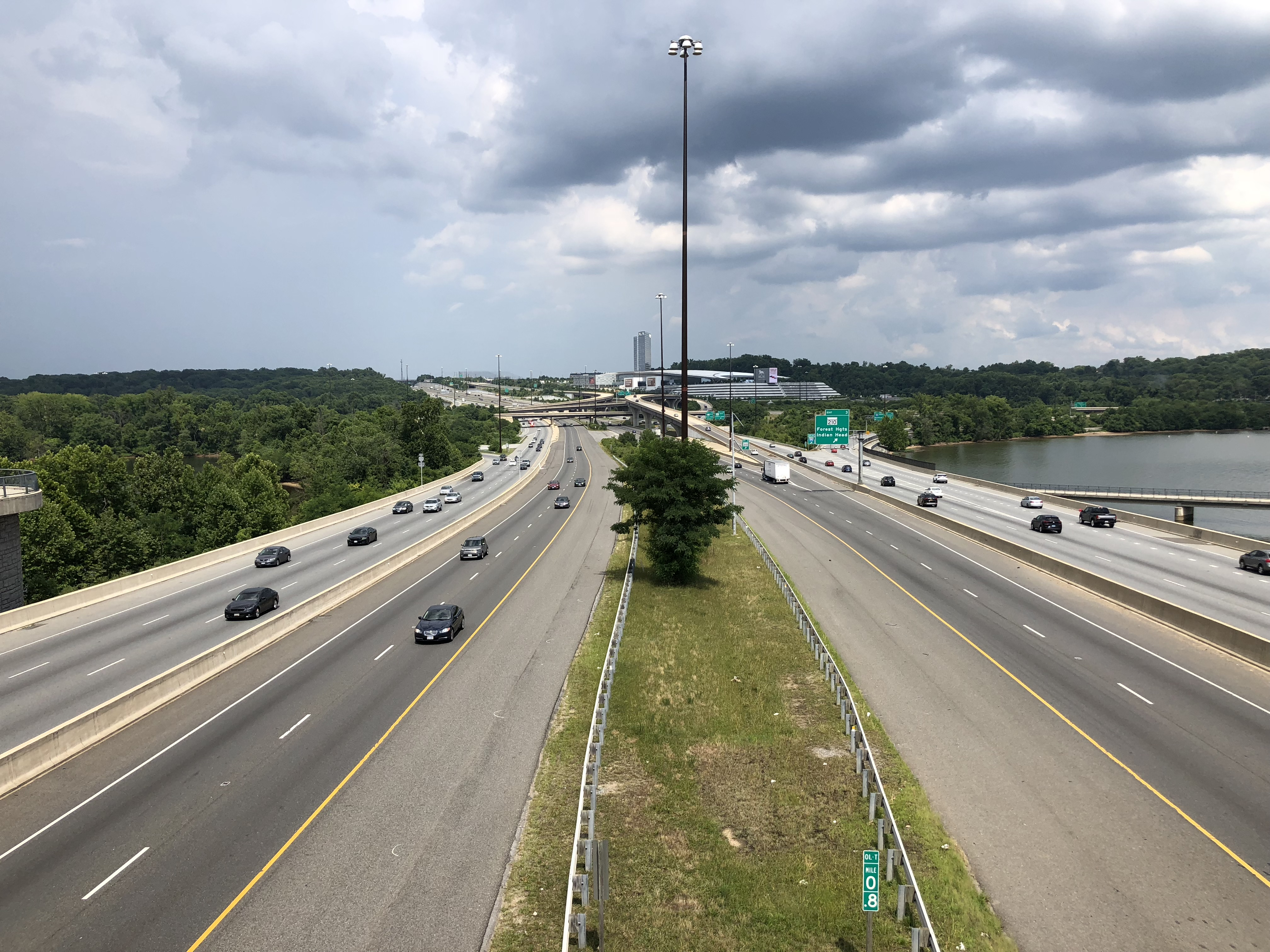
I-95/I-495 North in July 2019 entering Prince George's County from Virginia

The County contains a 28-mile portion of the 65-mile-long Capital Beltway. After a decades-long debate, an east–west toll freeway, the Intercounty Connector ("ICC"), which extends Interstate 370 in Montgomery County to connect I-270 with Interstate 95 and U.S. 1 in Laurel, opened in 2012. An 11.5-mile portion of the 32.5-mile-long Baltimore–Washington Parkway runs from the county's border with Washington, D.C., to its border with Anne Arundel County near Laurel.

The Washington Metropolitan Area Transit Authority operates Metrobus fixed-route bus service and Metrorail heavy-rail passenger service in and out of the county as well as the regional MetroAccess paratransit system for the handicapped. The Prince George's County Department of Public Works and Transportation also operates TheBus, a County-wide fixed-route bus system, and the Call-A-Bus service for passengers who do not have access to or have difficulty using fixed-route bus service. Call-A-Bus is a demand-response service which generally requires 14-days advance reservations. The county also offers a subsidized taxicab service for elderly and disabled residents called Call-A-Cab in which eligible customers who sign up for the service purchase coupons giving them a 50 percent discount with participating taxicab companies in Prince George's and Montgomery Counties.

=== Mass transit ===
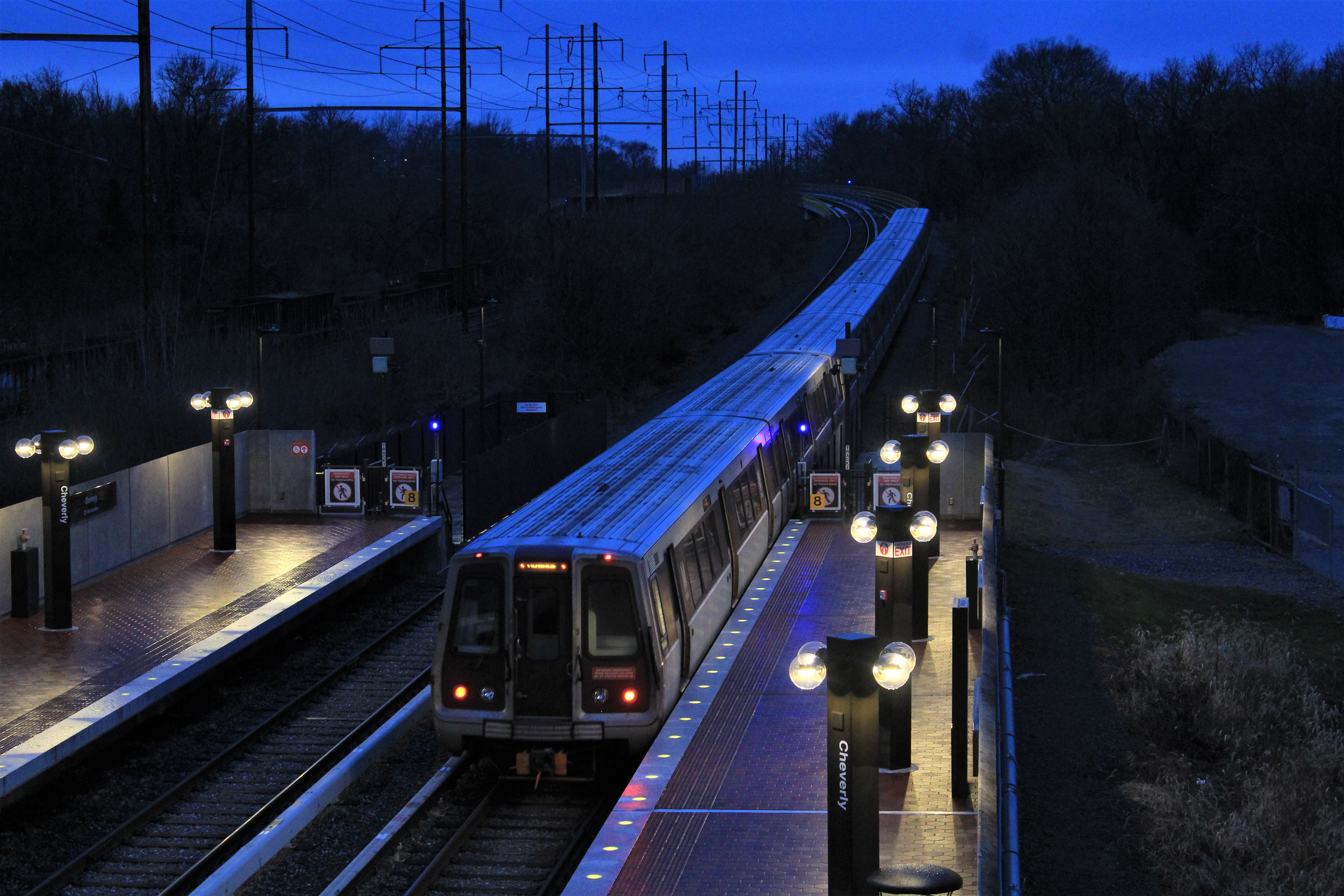
A westbound Orange Line train on the Washington Metro departing Cheverly in January 2023

==== Prince George's County Metro Rail ====
Washington Metropolitan Area Transit Authority has fifteen stations of the Washington Metro system located in Prince George's County, with four of them as terminus stations: Greenbelt, New Carrollton, Largo, and Branch Avenue. The Purple Line, which would link highly developed areas of both Montgomery and Prince George's Counties is currently under-construction and slated to open in 2027. The Purple Line will provide connections to the Washington Metropolitan Area Transit Authority's Red Line via Northern Prince George's County and Montgomery County. The Orange Line and MARC Train's Penn Line will have transfer points at New Carrollton.

==== Prince George's County Commuter Rail ====
The MARC Train (Maryland Area Rail Commuter) train service has two lines that traverse Prince George's County. The Camden Line, which runs between Baltimore Camden Station and Washington Union Station and has five stops in the county at Riverdale, College Park, Greenbelt, Muirkirk, and Laurel. The Penn Line runs on the Amtrak route between Pennsylvania and Washington Union stations. It has three stops in the county: Bowie State, Seabrook and New Carrollton.

==== Airports ====
The College Park Airport (CGS), established in 1909, is the world's oldest continuously operated airport and is home to the adjacent College Park Aviation Museum.

Privately owned general aviation airfields in the county include Freeway Airport (W00) in Mitchellville, Potomac Airfield (VKX) in Friendly, and private heliports.

The area is served by three airports: Ronald Reagan Washington National Airport (DCA) in Arlington County, Virginia, Baltimore–Washington International Thurgood Marshall Airport (BWI) in neighboring Anne Arundel County, and Dulles International Airport (IAD) in Dulles, Virginia.

Andrews Air Force Base (ADW), the airfield portion of Joint Base Andrews, is also near Camp Springs.

==== Water taxi ====
Prince George's County is served by a water taxi that operates from the National Harbor to Alexandria, Virginia and to The Wharf in Washington, D.C.

=== Major highways ===
- I-95
- I-295
- I-495 (Capital Beltway)
- I-595 / US 50
- US 1
  - US 1 Alt.
- US 301
- MD 3
- MD 4
- MD 5
- MD 193
- MD 197
- MD 198
- MD 200 Toll
- MD 201
- MD 202
- MD 210
- MD 214 (Central Avenue)
- MD 216
- MD 228
- MD 295
- MD 410
- MD 431
- MD 433
- MD 450
- MD 500
- MD 501

=== Future transit ===
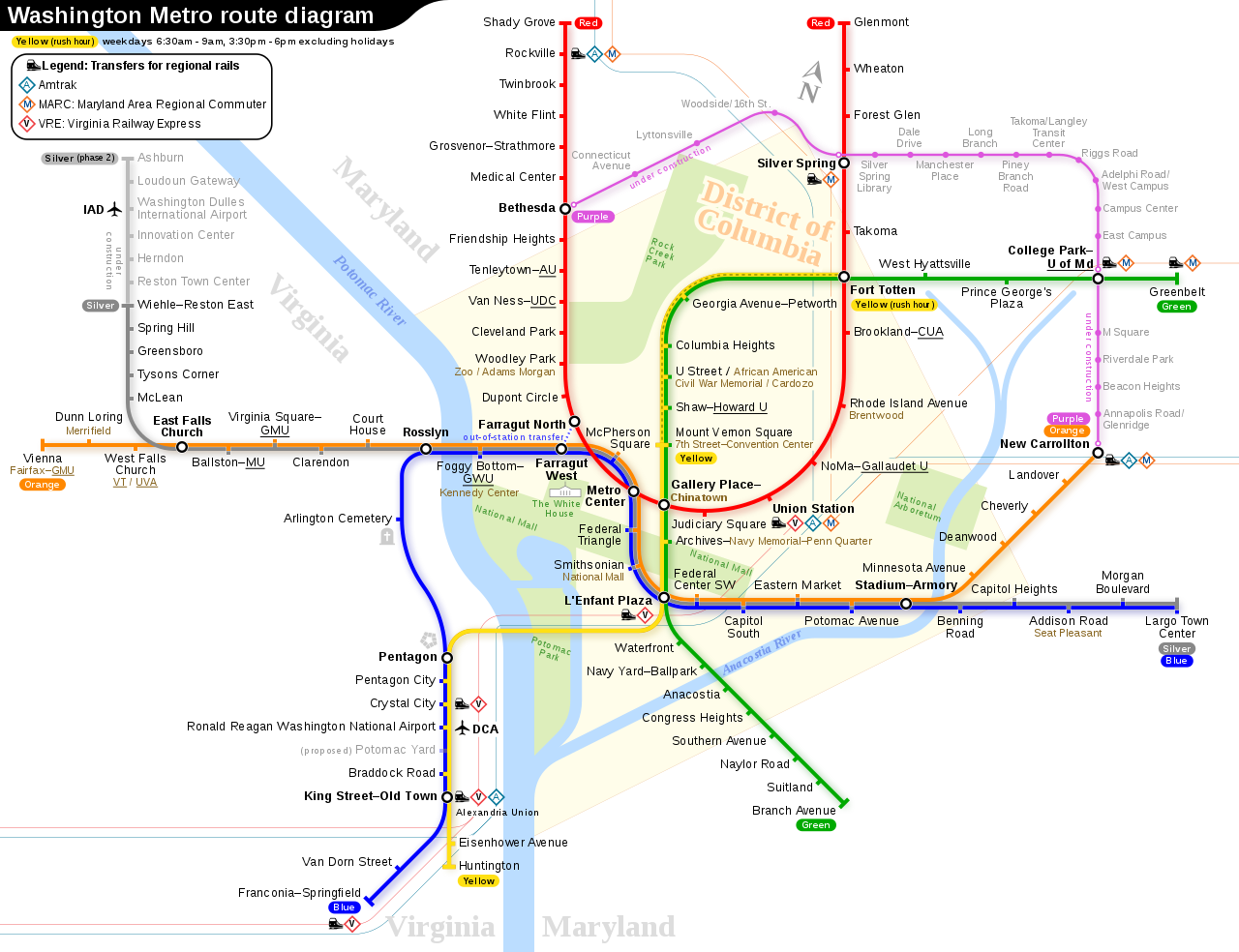
Washington Metro system map including the future Purple Line

Because of its location north and east of Washington, D.C., several future transit technology projects look to be routed partially through Prince George's County. The first stage of The Boring Company's proposed Washington-to-New York hyperloop will travel beneath the Baltimore–Washington Parkway through Prince George's en route to Baltimore. No hyperloop stops within the county are projected. Similarly, former Maryland Governor Larry Hogan has supported efforts to trial a 40-mile superconducting maglev (SCMaglev) train route connecting Washington to Baltimore. Proposed routes would run through Prince George's parallel to the Baltimore–Washington Parkway or along the Amtrak Penn Line corridor. As with the hyperloop, no SCMaglev stop is planned within Prince George's County. The Purple Line light transit rail is currently in construction in College Park and New Carrollton.

== Demographics ==
Historical population
Census	Pop.	Note	%±
1790	21,344		—
1800	21,175		−0.8%
1810	20,589		−2.8%
1820	20,216		−1.8%
1830	20,474		1.3%
1840	19,539		−4.6%
1850	21,549		10.3%
1860	23,327		8.3%
1870	21,138		−9.4%
1880	26,451		25.1%
1890	26,080		−1.4%
1900	29,898		14.6%
1910	36,147		20.9%
1920	43,347		19.9%
1930	60,095		38.6%
1940	89,490		48.9%
1950	194,182		117.0%
1960	357,395		84.1%
1970	660,567		84.8%
1980	665,071		0.7%
1990	729,268		9.7%
2000	801,515		9.9%
2010	863,420		7.7%
2020	967,201		12.0%
2025 (est.)	970,374		0.3%
U.S. Decennial Census; 1790–1960 1900–1990; 1990–2000 2010–2020

=== 2020 census ===
As of the 2020 census, the county had a population of 967,201, a median age of 36.7 years, and 21.8% of residents under the age of 18 versus 13.7% aged 65 or older. For every 100 females there were 90.7 males overall and 87.3 males for every 100 females age 18 and over. 97.6% of residents lived in urban areas while 2.4% lived in rural areas.

The racial makeup of the county was 12.9% White, 59.8% Black or African American, 0.9% American Indian and Alaska Native, 4.3% Asian, 0.1% Native Hawaiian or Pacific Islander, 14.4% from some other race, and 7.5% from two or more races, while Hispanic or Latino residents of any race comprised 21.2% of the population. The Hispanic population continues to grow, with several cities and CDPs reaching a Latino majority (Adelphi, Brentwood, Chillum, Colmar Manor, East Riverdale, Langley Park, Landover Hills, and Woodlawn).

There were 342,216 households in the county, of which 32.8% had children under the age of 18 living with them and 36.5% had a female householder with no spouse or partner present. About 27.8% of all households were made up of individuals and 8.9% had someone living alone who was 65 years of age or older.

There were 359,957 housing units, of which 4.9% were vacant. Among occupied housing units, 59.9% were owner-occupied and 40.1% were renter-occupied. The homeowner vacancy rate was 1.2% and the rental vacancy rate was 5.8%.

As of 2021, the most reported ancestries were African American (35.8%), Salvadoran (8.5%), English (3.1%), Irish (3%), and Mexican (3%). There are many residents of Prince George's county that are of Subsaharan African ancestry, with Nigerians accounting for 2.4% of the toal population, and Cameroonians accounting for 0.8%.

=== Racial and ethnic composition ===
Prince George's County, Maryland – Racial and ethnic composition Note: the US Census treats Hispanic/Latino as an ethnic category. This table excludes Latinos from the racial categories and assigns them to a separate category. Hispanics/Latinos may be of any race.
Race / Ethnicity (NH = Non-Hispanic)	Pop 1980	Pop 1990	Pop 2000	Pop 2010	Pop 2020	% 1980	% 1990	% 2000	% 2010	% 2020
White alone (NH)	383,215	303,090	194,836	128,853	109,060	57.62%	41.56%	24.31%	14.92%	11.28%
Black or African American alone (NH)	246,084	365,705	498,301	548,439	571,866	37.00%	50.15%	62.17%	63.52%	59.13%
Native American or Alaska Native alone (NH)	1,685	2,172	2,274	2,156	1,887	0.25%	0.30%	0.28%	0.25%	0.20%
Asian alone (NH)	16,515	27,344	30,803	34,815	41,436	2.48%	3.75%	3.84%	4.03%	4.28%
Native Hawaiian or Pacific Islander alone (NH)	x	x	318	330	335	x	x	0.04%	0.04%	0.03%
Other race alone (NH)	3,151	974	1,706	2,167	5,746	0.47%	0.13%	0.21%	0.25%	0.59%
Mixed race or Multiracial (NH)	x	x	16,220	17,688	31,408	x	x	2.02%	2.05%	3.25%
Hispanic or Latino (any race)	14,421	29,983	57,057	128,972	205,463	2.17%	4.11%	7.12%	14.94%	21.24%
Total	665,071	729,268	801,515	863,420	967,201	100.00%	100.00%	100.00%	100.00%	100.00%

Racial / Ethnic Profile of places in Prince George's County, Maryland (2020 Census)
Following is a table of cities, villages, and census designated places in Prince George's County, Maryland. Data for the United States (with and without Puerto Rico), the state of Maryland, and Prince George's County itself have been included for comparison purposes.
The majority racial/ethnic group is coded per the key below. Communities that extend into and adjacent county or counties are delineated with a ‡ followed by an accompanying explanatory note. The full population of each community has been tabulated including the population in adjacent counties.

Majority minority with no dominant group
Majority White
Majority Black
Majority Hispanic
Majority Asian

Racial and ethnic composition of places in Prince George's County (2020 Census) (NH = Non-Hispanic) Note: the US Census treats Hispanic/Latino as an ethnic category. This table excludes Latinos from the racial categories and assigns them to a separate category. Hispanics/Latinos may be of any race.
Place	Designation	Total Population	White alone (NH)	%	Black or African American alone (NH)	%	Native American or Alaska Native alone (NH)	%	Asian alone (NH)	%	Pacific Islander alone (NH)	%	Other race alone (NH)	%	Mixed race or Multiracial (NH)	%	Hispanic or Latino (any race)	%
United States of America (50 states and D.C.)	x	331,449,281	191,697,647	57.84%	39,940,338	12.05%	2,251,699	0.68%	19,618,719	5.92%	622,018	0.19%	1,689,833	0.51%	13,548,983	4.09%	62,080,044	18.73%
United States of America (50 states, D.C., and Puerto Rico)	x	334,735,155	191,722,195	57.28%	39,944,624	11.93%	2,252,011	0.67%	19,621,465	5.86%	622,109	0.19%	1,692,341	0.51%	13,551,323	4.05%	65,329,087	19.52%
Maryland	State	6,177,224	2,913,782	47.17%	1,795,027	29.06%	12,055	0.20%	417,962	6.77%	2,575	0.04%	35,314	0.57%	270,764	4.38%	729,745	11.81%
Prince George's County	County	967,201	109,060	11.28%	571,866	59.13%	1,887	0.20%	41,436	4.28%	335	0.03%	5,746	0.59%	31,408	3.25%	205,463	21.24%
Accokeek	CDP	13,927	1,996	14.33%	9,345	67.10%	51	0.37%	652	4.68%	9	0.06%	95	0.68%	664	4.77%	1,115	8.01%
Adelphi	CDP	16,823	1,571	9.34%	4,953	29.44%	36	0.21%	1,367	8.13%	6	0.04%	91	0.54%	336	2.00%	8,463	50.31%
Andrews AFB	CDP	3,025	1,355	44.79%	758	25.06%	22	0.73%	152	5.02%	14	0.46%	14	0.46%	232	7.67%	478	15.80%
Aquasco	CDP	913	460	50.38%	356	38.99%	6	0.66%	2	0.22%	0	0.00%	1	0.11%	43	4.71%	45	4.93%
Baden	CDP	2,114	1,029	48.68%	721	34.11%	8	0.38%	22	1.04%	1	0.05%	6	0.28%	146	6.91%	181	8.56%
Beltsville	CDP	20,133	4,268	21.20%	5,391	26.78%	37	0.18%	1,646	8.18%	6	0.03%	148	0.74%	514	2.55%	8,123	40.35%
Berwyn Heights	Town	3,345	1,279	38.24%	402	12.02%	4	0.12%	266	7.95%	1	0.03%	30	0.90%	163	4.87%	1,200	35.87%
Bladensburg	Town	9,657	294	3.04%	5,166	53.49%	23	0.24%	124	1.28%	5	0.05%	37	0.38%	196	2.03%	3,812	39.47%
Bowie	City	58,329	16,182	27.74%	30,832	52.86%	105	0.18%	2,616	4.48%	20	0.03%	374	0.64%	2,954	5.06%	5,246	8.99%
Brandywine	CDP	10,550	993	9.41%	8,026	76.08%	46	0.44%	230	2.18%	3	0.03%	48	0.45%	465	4.41%	739	7.00%
Brentwood	Town	3,828	545	14.24%	1,079	28.19%	10	0.26%	83	2.17%	4	0.10%	31	0.81%	115	3.00%	1,961	51.23%
Brock Hall	CDP	13,181	511	3.88%	11,440	86.79%	9	0.07%	221	1.68%	7	0.05%	61	0.46%	459	3.48%	473	3.59%
Brown Station	CDP	3,298	143	4.34%	2,699	81.84%	6	0.18%	73	2.21%	3	0.09%	8	0.24%	124	3.76%	242	7.34%
Calverton ‡	CDP	17,316	3,265	18.86%	7,397	42.72%	24	0.14%	2,646	15.28%	6	0.03%	96	0.55%	571	3.30%	3,311	19.12%
Camp Springs	CDP	22,734	1,362	5.99%	16,847	74.10%	62	0.27%	437	1.92%	16	0.07%	177	0.78%	712	3.13%	3,121	13.73%
Capitol Heights	Town	4,050	79	1.95%	3,294	81.33%	12	0.30%	15	0.37%	0	0.00%	22	0.54%	94	2.32%	534	13.19%
Cedar Heights	CDP	1,597	17	1.06%	1,310	82.03%	1	0.06%	12	0.75%	0	0.00%	5	0.31%	21	1.31%	231	14.46%
Cedarville	CDP	639	318	49.77%	165	25.82%	22	3.44%	11	1.72%	0	0.00%	2	0.31%	33	5.16%	88	13.77%
Cheverly	Town	6,170	1,929	31.26%	2,871	46.53%	7	0.11%	144	2.33%	4	0.06%	28	0.45%	312	5.06%	875	14.18%
Chillum	CDP	36,039	1,143	3.17%	14,451	40.10%	36	0.10%	745	2.07%	4	0.01%	224	0.62%	670	1.86%	18,766	52.07%
Clinton	CDP	38,760	2,286	5.90%	29,916	77.18%	99	0.26%	958	2.47%	9	0.02%	259	0.67%	1,258	3.25%	3,975	10.26%
College Park	City	34,740	16,602	47.79%	5,071	14.60%	57	0.16%	5,952	17.13%	4	0.01%	191	0.55%	1,534	4.42%	5,329	15.34%
Colmar Manor	Town	1,588	98	6.17%	389	24.50%	5	0.31%	141	8.88%	0	0.00%	13	0.82%	17	1.07%	925	58.25%
Coral Hills	CDP	9,997	140	1.40%	8,062	80.64%	23	0.23%	60	0.60%	3	0.03%	52	0.52%	253	2.53%	1,404	14.04%
Cottage City	Town	1,335	159	11.91%	459	34.38%	5	0.37%	69	5.17%	5	0.37%	9	0.67%	42	3.15%	587	43.97%
Croom	CDP	2,720	1,089	40.04%	1,126	41.40%	11	0.40%	30	1.10%	1	0.04%	29	1.07%	160	5.88%	274	10.07%
District Heights	City	5,959	136	2.28%	5,030	84.41%	27	0.45%	39	0.65%	3	0.05%	23	0.39%	143	2.40%	558	9.36%
Eagle Harbor	Town	67	19	28.36%	35	52.24%	0	0.00%	0	0.00%	0	0.00%	1	1.49%	8	11.94%	4	5.97%
East Riverdale	CDP	18,459	937	5.08%	4,229	22.91%	17	0.09%	1,039	5.63%	1	0.01%	101	0.55%	456	2.47%	11,679	63.27%
Edmonston	Town	1,617	179	11.07%	387	23.93%	3	0.19%	10	0.62%	2	0.12%	16	0.99%	59	3.65%	961	59.43%
Fairmount Heights	Town	1,528	17	1.11%	1,091	71.40%	0	0.00%	29	1.90%	0	0.00%	2	0.13%	44	2.88%	345	22.58%
Fairwood	CDP	7,983	562	7.04%	6,077	76.12%	7	0.09%	611	7.65%	3	0.04%	32	0.40%	349	4.37%	342	4.28%
Forest Heights	Town	2,658	113	4.25%	1,527	57.45%	3	0.11%	73	2.75%	7	0.26%	18	0.68%	69	2.60%	848	31.90%
Forestville	CDP	12,831	397	3.09%	10,370	80.82%	23	0.18%	131	1.02%	1	0.01%	73	0.57%	339	2.64%	1,497	11.67%
Fort Washington	CDP	24,261	2,170	8.94%	15,334	63.20%	32	0.13%	2,227	9.18%	17	0.07%	179	0.74%	828	3.41%	3,474	14.32%
Friendly	CDP	9,937	538	5.41%	6,697	67.39%	11	0.11%	512	5.15%	5	0.05%	99	1.00%	313	3.15%	1,762	17.73%
Glassmanor	CDP	18,430	298	1.62%	13,581	73.69%	40	0.22%	179	0.97%	7	0.04%	86	0.47%	406	2.20%	3,833	20.80%
Glenarden	City	6,402	100	1.56%	4,953	77.37%	8	0.12%	81	1.27%	0	0.00%	23	0.36%	235	3.67%	1,002	15.65%
Glenn Dale	CDP	14,698	2,441	16.61%	8,950	60.89%	15	0.10%	846	5.76%	0	0.00%	105	0.71%	481	3.27%	1,860	12.65%
Greenbelt	City	24,921	5,176	20.77%	11,897	47.74%	47	0.19%	2,323	9.32%	10	0.04%	192	0.77%	996	4.00%	4,280	17.17%
Hillandale ‡	CDP	5,774	1,469	25.44%	1,399	24.23%	5	0.09%	654	11.33%	3	0.05%	27	0.47%	189	3.27%	2,028	35.12%
Hillcrest Heights	CDP	15,793	300	1.90%	13,672	86.57%	43	0.27%	127	0.80%	3	0.02%	70	0.44%	374	2.37%	1,204	7.62%
Hyattsville	City	21,187	4,657	21.98%	6,546	30.90%	56	0.26%	769	3.63%	6	0.03%	180	0.85%	787	3.71%	8,186	38.64%
Kettering	CDP	14,424	308	2.14%	12,976	89.96%	11	0.08%	207	1.44%	1	0.01%	59	0.41%	400	2.77%	462	3.20%
Konterra	CDP	3,158	551	17.45%	1,581	50.06%	10	0.32%	486	15.39%	0	0.00%	18	0.57%	114	3.61%	398	12.60%
Lake Arbor	CDP	14,541	762	5.24%	12,407	85.32%	23	0.16%	311	2.14%	2	0.01%	77	0.53%	455	3.13%	504	3.47%
Landover	CDP	25,998	606	2.33%	16,647	64.03%	34	0.13%	669	2.57%	13	0.05%	172	0.66%	726	2.79%	7,131	27.43%
Landover Hills	Town	1,815	140	7.71%	533	29.37%	1	0.06%	18	0.99%	1	0.06%	15	0.83%	53	2.92%	1,054	58.07%
Langley Park	CDP	20,126	513	2.55%	2,119	10.53%	36	0.18%	354	1.76%	10	0.05%	107	0.53%	199	0.99%	16,788	83.41%
Lanham	CDP	11,282	588	5.21%	5,998	53.16%	17	0.15%	352	3.12%	0	0.00%	50	0.44%	233	2.07%	4,044	35.84%
Largo	CDP	11,605	232	2.00%	10,134	87.32%	25	0.22%	189	1.63%	1	0.01%	68	0.59%	421	3.63%	535	4.61%
Laurel	City	30,060	4,943	16.44%	14,846	49.39%	70	0.23%	2,458	8.18%	12	0.04%	279	0.93%	1,143	3.80%	6,309	20.99%
Marlboro Meadows	CDP	3,655	276	7.55%	2,880	78.80%	16	0.44%	32	0.88%	5	0.14%	19	0.52%	116	3.17%	311	8.51%
Marlboro Village	CDP	9,221	377	4.09%	8,031	87.09%	20	0.22%	87	0.94%	5	0.05%	23	0.25%	318	3.45%	360	3.90%
Marlow Heights	CDP	6,169	211	3.42%	4,622	74.92%	20	0.32%	109	1.77%	2	0.03%	19	0.31%	155	2.51%	1,031	16.71%
Marlton	CDP	9,802	779	7.95%	8,098	82.62%	32	0.33%	89	0.91%	0	0.00%	70	0.71%	353	3.60%	381	3.89%
Maryland Park	CDP	965	20	2.07%	661	68.50%	1	0.10%	6	0.62%	0	0.00%	10	1.04%	23	2.38%	244	25.28%
Melwood	CDP	3,977	407	10.23%	2,576	64.77%	16	0.40%	55	1.38%	2	0.05%	33	0.83%	131	3.29%	757	19.03%
Mitchellville	CDP	11,136	498	4.47%	9,218	82.78%	19	0.17%	341	3.06%	0	0.00%	42	0.38%	388	3.48%	630	5.66%
Morningside	Town	1,240	210	16.94%	602	48.55%	5	0.40%	13	1.05%	3	0.24%	6	0.48%	53	4.27%	348	28.06%
Mount Rainier	City	8,333	1,271	15.25%	3,300	39.60%	8	0.10%	186	2.23%	7	0.08%	52	0.62%	308	3.70%	3,201	38.41%
National Harbor	CDP	5,509	813	14.76%	2,984	54.17%	6	0.11%	437	7.93%	2	0.04%	59	1.07%	226	4.10%	982	17.83%
New Carrollton	City	13,715	720	5.25%	7,141	52.07%	21	0.15%	419	3.06%	6	0.04%	112	0.82%	329	2.40%	4,967	36.22%
North Brentwood	Town	593	42	7.08%	292	49.24%	0	0.00%	12	2.02%	0	0.00%	0	0.00%	16	2.70%	231	38.95%
Oxon Hill	CDP	18,791	833	4.43%	12,064	64.20%	51	0.27%	1,030	5.48%	14	0.07%	81	0.43%	530	2.82%	4,188	22.29%
Peppermill Village	CDP	5,264	86	1.63%	4,254	80.81%	14	0.27%	28	0.53%	2	0.04%	16	0.30%	119	2.26%	745	14.15%
Queen Anne	CDP	1,405	492	35.02%	685	48.75%	2	0.14%	48	3.42%	1	0.07%	6	0.43%	53	3.77%	118	8.40%
Queensland	CDP	2,191	296	13.51%	1,593	72.71%	13	0.59%	27	1.23%	0	0.00%	22	1.00%	95	4.34%	145	6.62%
Riverdale Park	Town	6,956	1,224	17.60%	1,838	26.42%	21	0.30%	231	3.32%	5	0.07%	28	0.40%	129	1.85%	3,480	50.03%
Rosaryville	CDP	11,548	784	6.79%	9,400	81.40%	16	0.14%	183	1.58%	11	0.10%	71	0.61%	422	3.65%	661	5.72%
Seabrook	CDP	19,627	1,501	7.65%	11,862	60.44%	18	0.09%	1,280	6.52%	3	0.02%	87	0.44%	585	2.98%	4,291	21.86%
Seat Pleasant	City	4,522	77	1.70%	3,502	77.44%	6	0.13%	38	0.84%	0	0.00%	21	0.46%	126	2.79%	752	16.63%
Silver Hill	CDP	6,381	161	2.52%	5,700	89.33%	11	0.17%	32	0.50%	1	0.02%	19	0.30%	154	2.41%	303	4.75%
South Laurel	CDP	29,602	3,911	13.21%	16,609	56.11%	61	0.21%	1,744	5.89%	12	0.04%	177	0.60%	1,035	3.50%	6,053	20.45%
Springdale	CDP	5,301	51	0.96%	4,315	81.40%	8	0.15%	152	2.87%	2	0.04%	26	0.49%	138	2.60%	609	11.49%
Suitland	CDP	25,839	489	1.89%	22,424	86.78%	32	0.12%	166	0.64%	1	0.00%	87	0.34%	615	2.38%	2,025	7.84%
Summerfield	CDP	14,758	264	1.79%	12,757	86.44%	36	0.24%	143	0.97%	1	0.01%	83	0.56%	423	2.87%	1,051	7.12%
Temple Hills	CDP	8,350	315	3.77%	6,833	81.83%	14	0.17%	120	1.44%	1	0.01%	24	0.29%	225	2.69%	818	9.80%
University Park	Town	2,454	1,605	65.40%	248	10.11%	3	0.12%	151	6.15%	0	0.00%	13	0.53%	146	5.95%	288	11.74%
Upper Marlboro	Town	652	167	25.61%	387	59.36%	5	0.77%	6	0.92%	0	0.00%	10	1.53%	25	3.83%	52	7.98%
Walker Mill	CDP	12,187	237	1.94%	10,737	88.10%	35	0.29%	57	0.47%	6	0.05%	46	0.38%	326	2.67%	743	6.10%
West Laurel	CDP	4,428	2,294	51.81%	796	17.98%	3	0.07%	316	7.14%	0	0.00%	24	0.54%	261	5.89%	734	16.58%
Westphalia	CDP	11,770	568	4.83%	9,265	78.72%	26	0.22%	198	1.68%	3	0.03%	71	0.60%	452	3.84%	1,187	10.08%
Woodlawn	CDP	7,541	306	4.06%	2,519	33.40%	11	0.15%	182	2.41%	0	0.00%	44	0.58%	168	2.23%	4,311	57.17%
Woodmore	CDP	4,513	350	7.76%	3,606	79.90%	6	0.13%	91	2.02%	0	0.00%	44	0.97%	205	4.54%	211	4.68%

=== 2010 census ===
As of the 2010 United States census, there were 863,420 people, 304,042 households, and 203,520 families residing in the county. The population density was 1,788.8 inhabitants per square mile (690.7/km^{2}). There were 328,182 housing units at an average density of 679.9 per square mile (262.5/km^{2}). The racial and ancestral makeup of the county was:

- 64.5% Black or African American
- 14.9% White (3.3% German, 3% Irish, 2% English, 1.5% Italian, 0.7% Polish)
- 0.5% American Indian
- 14.9% Hispanic or Latino (any race) (7.67% Salvadoran, 2.52% Mexican, 2.19% Guatemalan, 0.92% Honduran, 0.66% Puerto Rican, 0.56% Dominican)
- 4.1% Asian (1.08% Filipino, 0.9% Indian, 0.79% Chinese, 0.35% Korean, 0.3% Vietnamese, 0.26% Pakistani, 0.14% Bangladeshi)
- 0.1% Pacific islander
- 8.5% from other races
- 3.2% from two or more races.

Those of Hispanic or Latino origin made up 14.9% of the population, an equal percentage to Whites of indeterminate origin.

Of the 304,042 households, 36.8% had children under the age of 18 living with them, 40.1% were married couples living together, 20.4% had a female householder with no husband present, 33.1% were non-families, and 26.1% of all households were made up of individuals. The average household size was 2.78 and the average family size was 3.31. The median age was 34.9 years.

The median income for a household in the county was $71,260 and the median income for a family was $82,580. Males had a median income of $49,471 versus $49,478 for females. The per capita income for the county was $31,215. About 5.0% of families and 7.9% of the population were below the poverty line, including 9.6% of those under age 18 and 6.7% of those age 65 or over.

=== 2000 Census ===
In 2000, there were 801,515 people living in Prince George's County; the ethnic makeup of the county was as of 2000:

- 62.70% Black
- 27.04% white
- 0.35% Native American
- 7.12% Hispanic or Latino (of any race)
- 3.87% Asian
- 0.06% Native Hawaiian or Pacific Islander
- 3.38% Some other race
- 2.61% Two or more races

By the 2008 estimates there were 298,439 households, out of which 65.1% were family households and 34.9% were non-family households. 36.4% of households had children under the age of 18 living with them, 44.00% were married couples living together, 19.60% had a female householder with no husband present. 24.10% of all households were made up of individuals, and 4.90% had someone living alone who was 65 years of age or older. The average household size was 2.74 persons and the average family size was 3.25 persons.

In the county, the population was spread out, with 26.80% under the age of 18, 10.40% from 18 to 24, 33.00% from 25 to 44, 22.10% from 45 to 64, and 7.70% who were 65 years of age or older. The median age was 33 years. For every 100 females, there were 91.50 males. For every 100 females age 18 and over, there were 87.20 males.

The median income for a household in the county in 2008 was $71,696, and the median income for a family was $81,908. The 2008 mean income for a family in the county was $94,360. As of 2000, males had a median income of $38,904 versus $35,718 for females. The 2008 per capita income for the county was $23,360. About 4.70% of families and 7.40% of the population were below the poverty line, including 9.2% of those under age 18 and 7.1% of those age 65 or over. Prince George's County is the 70th most affluent county in the United States by median income for families and the most affluent county in the United States with an African-American majority. Almost 38.8% of all households in Prince George's County, earned over $100,000 in 2008.

=== Educational ===
"30.1% of all residents over the age of 25 had graduated from college and obtained a bachelor's degree (17.8%) or professional degree (12.2%). 86.2% of all residents over the age of 25 were high school graduates or higher."

=== Religion ===
Prince George's County is relatively religious compared to the rest of Maryland, hosting more than 800 churches, including 12 megachurches, as well as a number of mosques, synagogues, and Hindu and Buddhist temples. Property belonging to religious entities makes up 3,450 acres (14.0 km^{2}) of land in the county, or 1.8% of the total area of the county.

== Economy ==
From 2000 to 2020, Prince George's County ranked as the wealthiest African American-majority county in the United States; however, it was surpassed by Charles County, Maryland, in the 2020 census.

=== Top employers ===
According to the county's comprehensive annual financial report, the top private-sector employers in the county are the following. "NR" indicates not ranked in the top ten for the year given.

Employer	Employees (2021)	Employees (2014)	Employees (2011)	Employees (2005)
University of Maryland Capital Region Health	4,800	NR	NR	NR
United Parcel Service	3,300	4,220	4,220	2,300
MGM National Harbor	2,400	NR	NR	NR
Gaylord National Resort and Convention Center	2,000	2,430	2,000	NR
Verizon	1,800	2,738	2,738	NR
Southern Maryland Hospital Center	1,308	1,242	1,300	1,300
Doctor's Community Hospital	1,233	1,300	1,300	NR
Melwood Horticultural Training Center	1,200	NR	NR	NR
Marriott International	1,000	NR	NR	NR
Orndoff & Spaid, Inc	1,000	NR	NR	NR
Giant	NR	3,000	3,600	6,152
Dimensions Healthcare System	NR	2,500	2,500	2,100
Shoppers Food & Pharmacy	NR	1,975	1,975	1,975
Safeway	NR	1,605	1,605	2,400
Capital One Bank	NR	NR	1,456	NR
Target	NR	1,400	1,400	NR

The top public-sector employers in the county are as follows. "NR" indicates not ranked in the top ten for the year given.

Employer	Employees (2021)	Employees (2014)	Employees (2011)
Joint Base Andrews Naval Air Facility Washington	18,000	13,500	8,057
University System of Maryland	13,000	17,905	16,014
NASA/Goddard Space Flight Center	12,200	3,397	3,171
Internal Revenue Service	4,500	5,539	5,539
U.S. Census Bureau	4,285	4,414	4,287
National Maritime Intelligence-Integration Office	3,000	1,724	1,724
Prince George's Community College	1,800	2,637	1,700
U.S. Department of Agriculture	1,500	1,850	1,850
Adelphi Laboratory Center	1,500	NR	NR
National Oceanic and Atmospheric Administration	1,200	1,350	1,350
Prince George's County	NR (Note: The 2021 CAFR excluded state and local governments from the rankings in 2021.)	7,003	7,052

== Health and safety ==
In 2022, the county had lower smoking rates, a higher life expectancy and a higher proportion of the population with insurance than the national average.

As of 2020, the county had lower average violent crime rates than the national and state averages. In 2020, among predominantly African-American communities with a population of over 25,000, Prince George's County as well as Augusta, Georgia were considered safer than the national average.

Prince George's County has seen a 57% decline in violent crime rates between 2009 and 2020. The total crime rate for the county declined 30% between 2006 and 2011.

There is an animal shelter, operated by the county, located in Brown Station CDP (with an Upper Marlboro postal address).

== Education ==
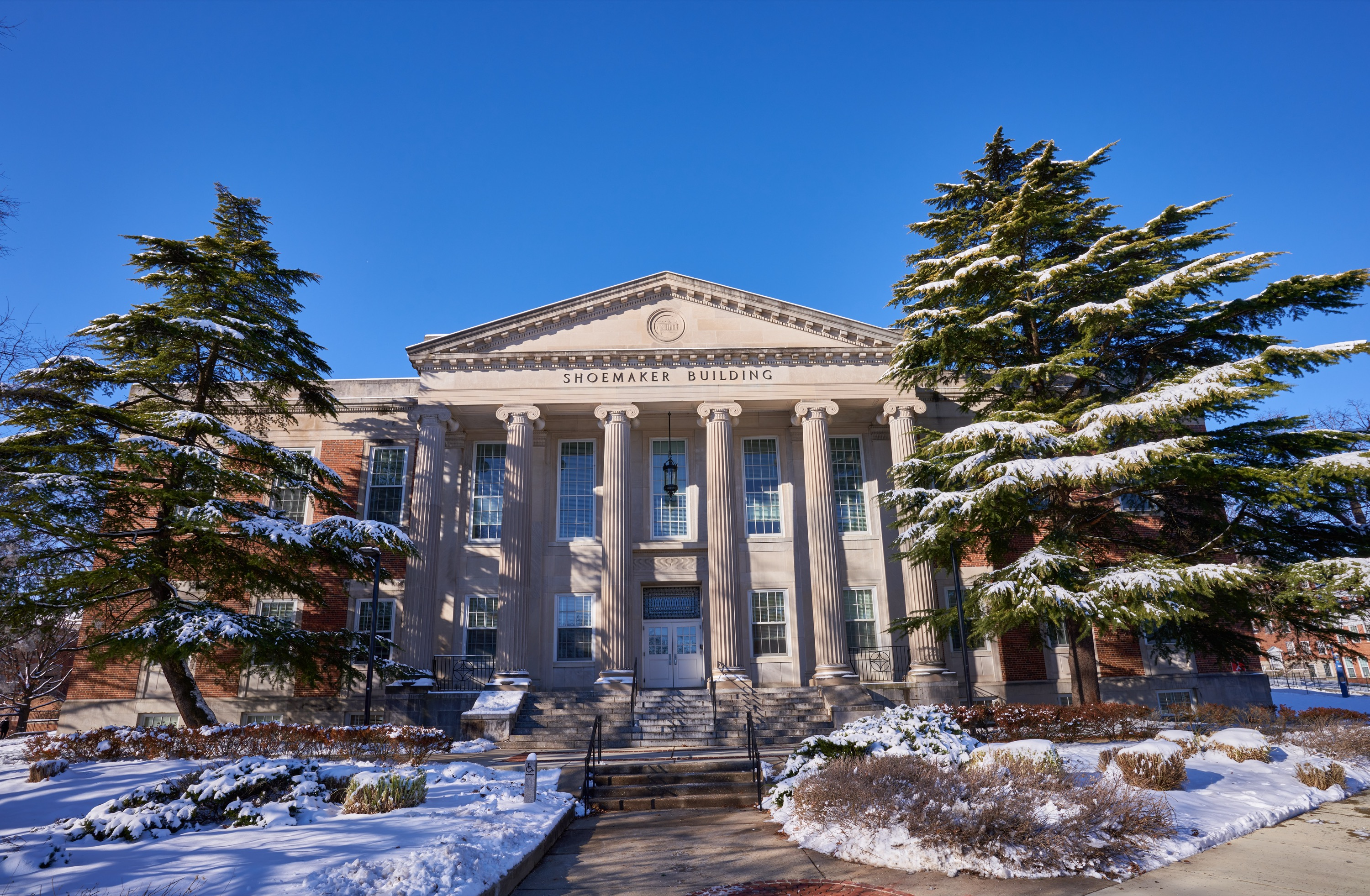
Shoemaker Building at the University of Maryland in College Park

=== Colleges and universities ===
- Bowie State University, located in an unincorporated area north of Bowie
- Brightwood College, located in an unincorporated area (Beltsville)
- Capital Seminary & Graduate School, in Greenbelt
- Capitol Technology University, located in an unincorporated area south of Laurel
- Prince George's Community College, located in an unincorporated area (Largo)
- Strayer University, PG Campus, in an unincorporated area (Suitland)
- University of Maryland, College Park, in College Park
- University of Maryland Global Campus, in an unincorporated area (Adelphi)

The University System of Maryland's Adelphi Office is in the unincorporated area of Adelphi. Formerly it was the headquarters of the entire system.

=== Public schools ===
The county's public schools are managed by the Prince George's County Public Schools system. It serves as the school district for the entire county.

== Enterprises and recreation ==
Prince George's County is home to the United States Department of Agriculture's Henry A. Wallace Beltsville Agricultural Research Center, NASA's Goddard Space Flight Center, the United States Census Bureau, Andrews Air Force Base, the National Archives and Records Administration's College Park facility, the University of Maryland's flagship College Park campus, Northwest Stadium (home of the Washington Commanders), and the National Harbor, which its developers, Peterson Companies and Gaylord Entertainment Company, bill as the largest single mixed-use project and combined convention center–hotel complex on the East Coast.

=== Media ===
- WPGC-FM, Morningside, MD, take their P-G-C call letters from the name Prince George's County
- Prince George's Sentinel, Seabrook, MD, weekly newspaper covering the county with a circulation of 23,000 copies
- The annual Prince George's Film Festival.

=== Recreation ===
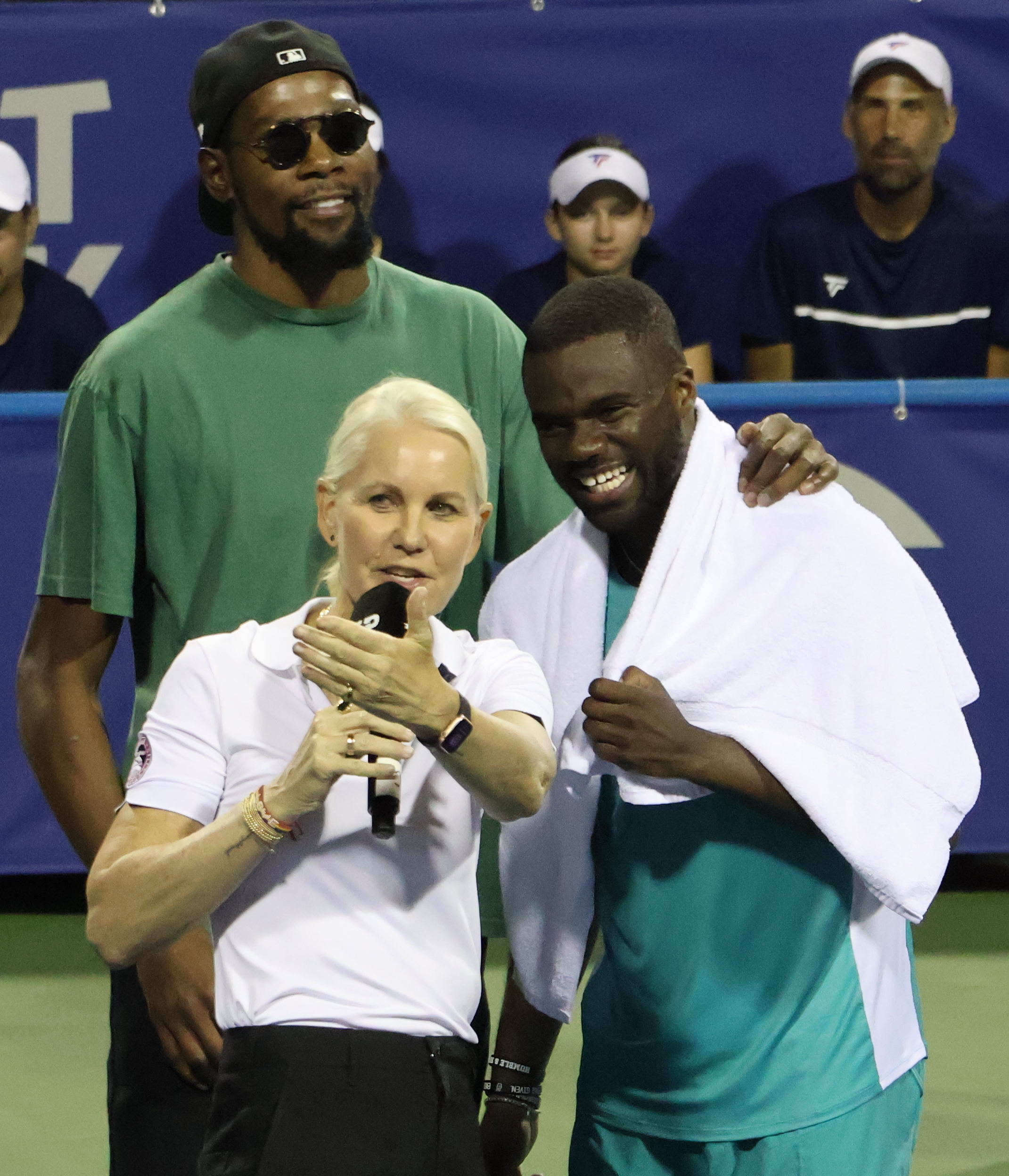
Prince George's County natives Kevin Durant and Frances Tiafoe (interviewed by Rennae Stubbs)

Although Prince George's County is not often credited for the Washington Commanders, the team's home stadium, Northwest Stadium, is in Landover. No other major-league professional sports teams are in the county, though Bowie hosts the Chesapeake Baysox, a Minor League Baseball team. The county is known for its very successful youth. In basketball, ESPN published an article declaring Prince George's County the new "Hoops Hot Bed" and ranked it as the number one basketball talent pool in the country. A number of basketball prospects, including Kevin Durant, Victor Oladipo, Jeff Green, Roy Hibbert and Ty Lawson, are from AAU basketball teams such as the PG Jaguars, DC Assault, and DC Blue Devils. Besides AAU, basketball has skyrocketed from local high schools such as DeMatha Catholic High School and Bishop McNamara High School, both of which have found some great success locally and nationally.

The county's basketball talent was profiled in the 2020 documentary Basketball County, produced by Kevin Durant. Durant and numerous other residents of the county who went on to success in basketball are featured in the film.

The Junior Tennis Champions Center, where Frances Tiafoe played from a young age, is in College Park.

== Communities ==
This county contains the following incorporated municipalities:

=== Cities ===
- Bowie
- College Park
- District Heights
- Glenarden
- Greenbelt
- Hyattsville
- Laurel
- Mount Rainier
- New Carrollton
- Seat Pleasant

=== Towns ===
- Berwyn Heights
- Bladensburg
- Brentwood
- Capitol Heights
- Cheverly
- Colmar Manor
- Cottage City
- Eagle Harbor
- Edmonston
- Fairmount Heights
- Forest Heights
- Landover Hills
- Morningside
- North Brentwood
- Riverdale Park
- University Park
- Upper Marlboro (county seat)

Part of the city of Takoma Park was formerly in Prince George's County, but since 1997 the city has been entirely in Montgomery County. The part of Takoma Park that changed counties comprises two residential neighborhoods, Carole Highlands (an unincorporated portion of which is still in Prince George's County) and New Hampshire Gardens.

=== Census-designated places ===
Unincorporated areas are also considered as towns by many people and listed in many collections of towns, but they lack local government. Various organizations, such as the United States Census Bureau, the United States Postal Service, and local chambers of commerce, define the communities they wish to recognize differently, and since they are not incorporated, their boundaries have no official status outside the organizations in question. The Census Bureau recognizes the following census-designated places in the county:

- Accokeek
- Adelphi
- Andrews AFB
- Aquasco
- Baden
- Beltsville
- Brandywine
- Brock Hall
- Brown Station
- Calverton
- Camp Springs
- Cedar Heights
- Cedarville
- Chillum
- Clinton
- Coral Hills
- Croom
- East Riverdale
- Fairwood
- Forestville
- Fort Washington
- Friendly
- Glassmanor
- Glenn Dale
- Hillandale
- Hillcrest Heights
- Kettering
- Konterra
- Lake Arbor
- Landover
- Langley Park
- Lanham
- Largo
- Marlboro Meadows
- Marlboro Village
- Marlow Heights
- Marlton
- Maryland Park
- Melwood
- Mitchellville
- National Harbor
- Oxon Hill
- Peppermill Village
- Queen Anne
- Queensland
- Rosaryville
- Seabrook
- Silver Hill
- South Laurel
- Springdale
- Suitland
- Summerfield
- Temple Hills
- Walker Mill
- West Laurel
- Westphalia
- Woodlawn
- Woodmore

=== Unincorporated communities ===
- Ardmore
- Avondale
- Carmody Hills
- Carole Highlands
- Chapel Oaks
- Cheltenham
- Collington
- Danville
- Forestville
- Green Meadows
- Indian Creek Village
- Kentland
- Lewisdale
- Meadows
- Montpelier
- Muirkirk
- Palmer Park
- Piscataway
- Raljon
- Rogers Heights
- South Bowie
- Tantallon
- Tuxedo
- Vansville
- West Hyattsville
- White Hall
- Woodyard

=== Ghost town ===
- Good Luck

== Sister cities ==
Prince George's County has three sister cities, as designated by Sister Cities International:

- Royal Bafokeng Nation, South Africa
- Rishon LeZion, Israel
- Ziguinchor, Senegal

== Notable people ==
- Karen Allen, actor, (National Lampoon's Animal House, Raiders of the Lost Ark), director, grew up in New Carrollton and attended DuVal High School.
- Angela Alsobrooks, U.S. senator; former county executive and former state's attorney for Prince George's County; grew up in Camp Springs.
- Thurl Bailey, professional basketball player; grew up in Landover.
- Jonathan Banks, actor; grew up in Chillum.
- Ben Barnes, Member of the Maryland House of Delegates, from Greenbelt, Maryland.
- John H. Bayne, Civil War-era state senator, physician, and noted horticulturist who owned the Salubria plantation near Oxon Hill/National Harbor.
- Michael Beasley, professional basketball player for the New York Knicks
- Len Bias, All-American Basketball star at the University of Maryland in the 1980s, grew up in Landover Hills and attended Northwestern High School in Hyattsville.
- Riddick Bowe, former world heavyweight boxing champion, and family lived in Sero Estates, Fort Washington.
- Sergey Brin, founder of Google, grew up in Adelphi and attended Eleanor Roosevelt High School in Greenbelt.
- Chuck Brown (1936–2012) "Godfather of Go-Go", a subgenre of funk that evolved in the D.C. area in the 1970s; lived in Brandywine
- Steve Byrnes, former NASCAR TV analyst, grew up in New Carrollton, attended both Largo High School & University of Maryland
- John Carroll, S.J. (1735–1815), first Roman Catholic bishop and archbishop in the United States, and founder of Georgetown University, was born in Upper Marlboro.
- Eva Cassidy, singer and guitarist, grew up in Oxon Hill and later Bowie.
- JC Chasez, singer/producer, grew up in Bowie.
- Frank Cho, award-winning cartoonist, grew up in Beltsville and attended community college and university in the county.
- Thomas John Claggett (1742–1816), first Episcopal bishop consecrated in the United States and third Chaplain of the United States Senate, was from Upper Marlboro.
- Leonard Covington (1768–1813), born in Aquasco, U.S. congressman from Maryland
- Jermaine Crawford, actor, The Wire, born and raised in the county
- Kevin Durant, NBA player, grew up in Prince George's County
- Roger L. Easton, naval scientist, the chief inventor of GPS and winner of the 2004 National Medal of Technology, lived on Oxon Hill Road in Oxon Hill.
- John Fahey, guitarist who influenced the "American primitive" style of acoustic picking, grew up in Takoma Park before it was transferred to Montgomery County. The independent record label he founded was called Takoma Park Records.
- Francis B. Francois, lawyer and engineer, lived in Bowie for over 40 years. In 1999, he was elected to the National Academy of Engineering in recognition of his achievements in the field of engineering and policy leadership in surface transportation infrastructure and research. He served on the Prince George's County council as an elected official for 10 years.
- Markelle Fultz, NBA player, born and raised in Upper Marlboro.
- Danny Gatton, guitarist, lived in Oxon Hill and graduated from Oxon Hill Senior High School, later lived for many years in Accokeek.
- Kathie Lee Gifford, network television personality, grew up in Bowie.
- Ginuwine, R&B pop musician, lived in Fort Washington.
- Lyle Goodhue (1903–1981), USDA research scientist and inventor, lived in Prince George's County from 1935 to 1945.
- Jeff Green, NBA player for the Brooklyn Nets
- Goldie Hawn, actress, director, and producer, grew up in Takoma Park before it was transferred to Montgomery County.
- Jim Henson, creator of the Muppets later used on Sesame Street, grew up in University Park and attended Northwestern High School in Hyattsville.
- Taraji P. Henson, actress, attended Oxon Hill High School.
- Roy Hibbert, professional basketball player for the Indiana Pacers, and raised in Adelphi
- Larry Hogan, the 62nd governor of Maryland from 2015 to 2023, grew up in Landover, attended Saint Ambrose Catholic School in Cheverly and DeMatha Catholic High School in Hyattsville. As a result of his parents' divorce, Hogan moved to Florida and later moved back to Maryland in Anne Arundel County.
- Steny Hoyer, Floor leader of the United States House of Representatives since 2003, lived as a teenager in Suitland and Mitchellville, attended Suitland High School and Univ. Maryland – College Park, and later lived in Friendly before moving to St. Mary's County.
- Cathy Hughes, founder and manager of Radio One, the nation's largest African American broadcasting company
- Jarrett Jack, basketball player for the Brooklyn Nets
- Isis King, first transgender contestant in America's Next Top Model (Cycles 11 and 17)
- Jeff Kinney, author of the Diary of a Wimpy Kid series, is from Fort Washington.
- Martin Lawrence, actor and comedian, lived in Landover and attended Eleanor Roosevelt High School in Greenbelt
- Ty Lawson, basketball player for the Washington Wizards
- Lettice Lee, colonial society hostess
- Sugar Ray Leonard, boxing champion, grew up in Palmer Park.
- G. Gordon Liddy, presidential aide convicted in the Watergate scandal, later an author and radio personality, lived in Fort Foote, Fort Washington.
- John P. McDonough, Maryland Secretary of State, from Bladensburg.
- Thomas V. "Mike" Miller, Maryland State Senate President from 1987 to 2020, was born and raised in Clinton and attended Surrattsville High School. Miller studied Business Administration at the University of Maryland, College Park, graduating in 1964. Miller's law firm was located in Clinton. Miller resided in Calvert County.
- Mýa, R&B pop musician, attended Eleanor Roosevelt High School in Greenbelt, Maryland as a violinist in the orchestra among the class of 1994.
- Rico Nasty, rapper born in Largo, Maryland. Raised in Palmer Park and attended Charles Herbert Flowers High School.
- Sammy Nestico, band music arranger, lived in Oxon Hill in the 1960s.
- Redveil, rapper, songwriter, and producer.
- Lio Rush, professional WWE wrestler from Lanham.
- Jan Scruggs, conceived the National Vietnam Veterans Memorial, grew up in Bowie.
- Walt Simonson, comic book writer and artist, best known for his mid-1980s run on Marvel Comics' Thor, grew up in the Calvert Hills section of College Park.
- Substantial, rapper originally from Cheverly.
- Michael Sweetney, former professional basketball player.
- Alethia Tanner, school founder and businesswoman who purchased the freedom of many community members
- Kameron Taylor (born 1994), basketball player for Maccabi Tel Aviv in the Israeli Basketball Premier League and the EuroLeague
- Turkey Tayac, Piscataway Indian leader and herbal doctor, lived in Accokeek for many years and is buried there.
- Frances Tiafoe, tennis player, from Hyattsville, born to immigrants from Sierra Leone.
- Dominic Wade, professional boxer, from Largo.
- Wale, hip-hop artist, often notes in his songs how he is from "PG County", and the "DMV" region (D.C, Maryland, Virginia).
- Sumner Welles, U.S. Undersecretary of State to Franklin Roosevelt, built and lived in Oxon Hill Manor, which is now a public facility.
- Delonte West, former NBA player and graduate of Eleanor Roosevelt High School in Greenbelt, MD
- Morgan Wootten coached at DeMatha Catholic High School in Hyattsville from 1956 to 2002. The coach with the most wins in high school basketball history, he was elected to the Basketball Hall of Fame, the only high school basketball coach ever so honored. He currently resides in University Park.
- Link Wray, pioneering rock guitarist, lived in Accokeek for many years.
- Xanman, rapper from Landover.

== Namesakes ==
- The USS Prince Georges (AK-224), was a United States Navy Crater-class cargo ship named after the county.

== See also ==
- National Register of Historic Places listings in Prince George's County, Maryland
