= John H. Bayne =

19th-century Maryland politician, horticulturalist, and slaveholder

Maryland Senate
- In office December 1861 – 1864
- Preceded by: John B. Brooke
- Succeeded by: Daniel Clarke

Maryland House of Delegates
- In office 1841

Personal details
- Born: February 15, 1804 Spaldings District, Prince George's County, Maryland, U.S.
- Died: August 18, 1870 (aged 66)
- Resting place: St. Barnabas Episcopal Church Cemetery, Temple Hills, Maryland
- Party: Whig (1841); Union (1861–1864)
- Spouse: Mary Frances McDaniel (m. 1827; died 1840)
- Children: 4

John Henry Bayne (1804–1870) was a Maryland politician and medical doctor who served in the state House of Delegates and state senate. Despite being a slaveholder and defender of chattel slavery, Bayne served as a surgeon and brevet colonel in the Union Army during the Civil War. By 1864, he viewed it impossible to maintain slavery and the Union, and he encouraged Maryland to abolish slavery in its new constitution.

Bayne was owner of the Salubria plantation near Oxon Hill, Prince George's County, Maryland. He was elected as a Whig to represent Prince George's in the House of Delegates' 1841 session. A year later, he became a justice of the peace. From December 1861 to 1864, he represented Prince George's in the state senate as a Unionist. Both as a delegate and as a private citizen, Bayne was a strong advocate for slaveholders and in particular advocated for government action to prevent enslaved people from escaping bondage.

Bayne was also a noted horticulturist, writing extensively about the cultivation of strawberries and tomatoes, among other fruits. He reportedly had more than 15,000 fruit trees on his farm. In 1847, The Baltimore Sun referred to Bayne as "that prince of horticulturists." He assisted in the planning for the Maryland Agricultural College, the precursor to the University of Maryland, College Park.
