= Maryland Park, Maryland =

Coordinates: 38°53′18″N 76°54′25″W

Maryland Park
- Census-designated place
- Location within the state of Maryland Maryland Park (the United States)
- Country: United States of America
- State: Maryland
- County: Prince George's

Area
  - Total: 0.18 sq mi (0.46 km^{2})
  - Land: 0.18 sq mi (0.46 km^{2})
  - Water: 0 sq mi (0.00 km^{2})

Population (2020)
  - Total: 965
  - Density: 5,400/sq mi (2,090/km^{2})
- Time zone: UTC-5 (Eastern (EST))
  - Summer (DST): UTC-4 (EDT)
- FIPS code: 24-51125

Maryland Park is a census designated place in Prince George's County, Maryland, United States. It first appeared as a CDP in the 2020 Census with a population of 965.

== Demographics ==
Historical population
Census	Pop.	Note	%±
2020	965		—
U.S. Decennial Census; 2020

Maryland Park first appeared as a census designated place in the 2020 U.S. census.

=== Racial and ethnic composition ===
Maryland Park CDP, Maryland – Racial and ethnic composition Note: the US Census treats Hispanic/Latino as an ethnic category. This table excludes Latinos from the racial categories and assigns them to a separate category. Hispanics/Latinos may be of any race.
Race / Ethnicity (NH = Non-Hispanic)	Pop 2020	% 2020
White alone (NH)	20	2.07%
Black or African American alone (NH)	661	68.50%
Native American or Alaska Native alone (NH)	1	0.10%
Asian alone (NH)	6	0.62%
Native Hawaiian or Pacific Islander alone (NH)	0	0.00%
Other race alone (NH)	10	1.04%
Mixed race or Multiracial (NH)	23	2.38%
Hispanic or Latino (any race)	244	25.28%
Total	965	100.00%
