= Brown Station, Maryland =

Brown Station
- Census-designated place
- Location within the state of Maryland Brown Station (the United States)
- Coordinates: 38.854°N 76.798°W
- Country: United States of America
- State: Maryland
- County: Prince George's

Area
  - Total: 6.22 sq mi (16.12 km^{2})
  - Land: 6.17 sq mi (15.97 km^{2})
  - Water: 0.058 sq mi (0.15 km^{2})

Population (2020)
  - Total: 3,298
  - Density: 534.8/sq mi (206.49/km^{2})
- Time zone: UTC-5 (Eastern (EST))
  - Summer (DST): UTC-4 (EDT)
- FIPS code: 24-10737

Brown Station is a census designated place in Prince George's County, Maryland, United States. Per the 2020 Census, the population was 3,298.

== History ==
The Brown Station CDP was first defined by the U.S. Census Bureau for the 2020 U.S. census. The areas for Brown Station were taken from Brock Hall and Westphalia as defined in the 2010 U.S. census. Brown Station Road contains the Prince George's County landfill, as well as its new animal shelter.

== Demographics ==
Historical population
Census	Pop.	Note	%±
2020	3,298		—
U.S. Decennial Census; 2020

Brown Station first appeared as a census designated place in the 2020 U.S. census.

=== Racial and ethnic composition ===
Brown Station CDP, Maryland – Racial and ethnic composition Note: the US Census treats Hispanic/Latino as an ethnic category. This table excludes Latinos from the racial categories and assigns them to a separate category. Hispanics/Latinos may be of any race.
Race / Ethnicity (NH = Non-Hispanic)	Pop 2020	% 2020
White alone (NH)	143	4.34%
Black or African American alone (NH)	2,699	81.84%
Native American or Alaska Native alone (NH)	6	0.18%
Asian alone (NH)	73	2.21%
Native Hawaiian or Pacific Islander alone (NH)	3	0.09%
Other race alone (NH)	8	0.24%
Mixed race or Multiracial (NH)	124	3.76%
Hispanic or Latino (any race)	242	7.34%
Total	3,298	100.00%

=== 2020 census ===
As of the 2020 census, the median age was 46.3 years. 19.7% of residents were under the age of 18 and 20.3% of residents were 65 years of age or older. For every 100 females there were 84.5 males, and for every 100 females age 18 and over there were 79.0 males age 18 and over.

92.1% of residents lived in urban areas, while 7.9% lived in rural areas.

There were 1,132 households in Brown Station, of which 31.0% had children under the age of 18 living in them. Of all households, 53.7% were married-couple households, 11.2% were households with a male householder and no spouse or partner present, and 32.9% were households with a female householder and no spouse or partner present. About 24.8% of all households were made up of individuals and 14.3% had someone living alone who was 65 years of age or older.

There were 1,163 housing units, of which 2.7% were vacant. The homeowner vacancy rate was 1.8% and the rental vacancy rate was 1.7%.

== Education ==
It is in Prince George's County Public Schools.

Schools in the CDP include: Barack Obama Elementary School, and Dr. Henry A. Wise Jr. High School. These schools, in the 2010 U.S. census, were in the Westphalia CDP.

School zones include:

- Elementary: Obama, Arrowhead, and Perrywood (in separate zones)
- Middle: Kettering and James Madison (in separate zones)
- High: Wise, and Largo High School (in separate zones)

Obama Elementary was the first school in the Washington, D.C., area that was named after the former president. It is adjacent to Wise High School. The Prince George's County school board approved of the name of the school on June 25, 2009; all board members voted in favor of the renaming. The school opened on August 23, 2010, and had a cost of $25 million. The architect was Grimm + Parker Architects, and it was built for 792 students. The school's cooling system relies on over 144 geothermal pumps. The initial enrollment was 798, slightly higher than the school's stated capacity. Its opening relieved Arrowhead, Marlton, Melwood, Patuxent and Perrywood, elementary schools. The first principal was Pearl Harmon, a Liberian American; in 2014 she was reassigned to an administrative position in the PG County school system. Several school board members argued that naming a school after Obama would inspire area students. Many schools in PG County were named after African-Americans, and PG County voters primarily support the Democratic Party, Obama's political party. In the 2008 U.S. Presidential Election, 89% of PG County residents voted for Obama. The chairperson of the PG County Republican Party Central Committee, Mykel Harris, argued that the county should not name a school after a current president, while the chairperson of the board, Ron L. Watson, stated that the vote was not done out of political considerations.
