= Jewitt =

Jewitt is a surname. Notable people with the surname include:

- Arthur Jewitt (1772–1852), English topographer
- Bradley S. Jewitt (born 1969), American politician
- Christine Jewitt (1926–2018), Canadian outfielder
- David C. Jewitt (born 1958), British-American astronomer
- Edward Holmes Jewitt (1849–1929), English artist
- Jim Jewitt (1933–1990), Australian rules footballer
- John R. Jewitt (1783–1821), English armourer
- Lee Jewitt (born 1987), English rugby league footballer
- Llewellynn Jewitt (1816–1886), British illustrator, engraver, natural scientist and author
- Orlando Jewitt (1799–1869), British architectural wood-engraver

== See also ==
- 6434 Jewitt, asteroid
- Jewett (disambiguation)
