= Jewett (surname) =

Jewett is a surname. Notable people with the surname include:

- Alf Jewett (1899–1980), English footballer
- Bob Jewett (1934–2015), American football player
- Charles Coffin Jewett (1816–1868), American librarian
- Charles W. Jewett (Connecticut politician) (1913–2000), American politician
- Charles W. Jewett (Indiana politician) (1884–1961), American lawyer and politician
- Clyde Jewett (1907–1983), American politician, member of the Wisconsin State Assembly
- Daniel T. Jewett (1807–1906), U.S. Senator from Missouri
- David Jewett (1772–1842), American naval officer and privateer, an instrumental figure in Argentina's claim to the Falkland Islands
- Edgar B. Jewett (1843–1924), American politician, mayor of the city of Buffalo, New York
- Eleanore Myers Jewett (1890–?), American author
- Eliezer Jewett (1731–1817), American founder and namesake of Jewett City, Connecticut
- Elisha P. Jewett (1801–1894), American businessman, banker and political figure
- Eliza Ann Jewett (1779–1856), American real-estate investor
- Erastus W. Jewett (1836–1906), American Medal of Honor recipient
- Ethel Jewett (1877–1944), American silent film actress
- Fidelia Jewett (1851–1933), American mathematics and botany teacher
- Frank B. Jewett (1879–1949), American engineer
- Frank Jewett (sailor) (1917–1986), American sailor
- Freeborn G. Jewett (1791–1858), American lawyer and politician
- George Jewett (1870–1908), American athlete
- Gordon Jewett (born 1978), Canadian cross-country skier
- Grace Jewett (1876-1946), American architect
- Harvey C. Jewett IV (born 1948), American attorney
- Helen Jewett (1813–1836), American prostitute from New York City, famous for having been murdered
- Hugh J. Jewett (1817–1898), U.S. Representative from Ohio
- Isaiah Jewett (born 1997), Olympic American middle-distance runner
- Jewett W. Adams (1835–1920), American politician
- John P. Jewett (1814–1884), 19th century American book publisher from Boston, Massachusetts
- John Welden Jewett (1870–1905) American teacher, community leader
- Joshua Jewett (1815–1861), U.S. Representative from Kentucky
- Kenneth Jewett (1880–1944), American boxer
- Luther Jewett (1772–1860), U.S. Representative from Vermont
- Lyman Jewett (1813–1897), American Baptist missionary
- Mary Gregory Jewett (1908–1976), American historian and journalist
- Maude Sherwood Jewett (1875–1953), American sculptor
- Milo Parker Jewett (1808–1882), American college president
- Nat Jewett (1844–1914), American baseball player
- Nehemiah Jewett (1643–1720), colonial-era speaker of the Massachusetts House of Representatives
- Otho C. Jewett (1852-1902), American architect
- Paul King Jewett (1920–1991), American Christian theologian
- Pauline Jewett (1922–1992), Canadian Member of Parliament
- Randolph Jewett (1602–1675), English organist
- Sarah Orne Jewett (1849–1909), American author
- Solomon Jewett and his brother Phil, American sheep farmers, and oil and bank company owners
- Sophie Jewett (1861–1909), American poet and professor
- Stephen S. Jewett (1858–1932), American lawyer and politician
- Ted Jewett (1904–1961), American character actor
- Travis Jewett, American baseball coach
- Trent Jewett (born 1964), American baseball coach
- Willem Jewett (1963–2022), American lawyer and politician
- William Smith Jewett (1821–1873), American painter

== See also ==
- Jewitt, surname
- Jewett Campbell (1912–1999), American painter, teacher
