= Jowett (surname) =

Jowett is a surname of early medieval English origin. Notable people with the surname include:

- Benjamin Jowett (1817–1893), English scholar and theologian
- Edmund Jowett (1858–1936), Australian Country Party politician
- Fred Jowett (rugby player) (1879–1939), Welsh rugby player
- Frederick William Jowett (1864–1944), British Labour politician who took an anti-war stance
- Jim Jowett (1926–1986), English amateur footballer
- John Henry Jowett (1864–1923), English Protestant preacher and author
- Percy Hague Jowett (1882–1955), British artist and arts administrator
- William Jowett (1787–1855), English missionary

== See also ==
- Jewett (disambiguation)
- Jowell (disambiguation)
