= Edward Holmes Jewitt =

English artist (1849–1929)

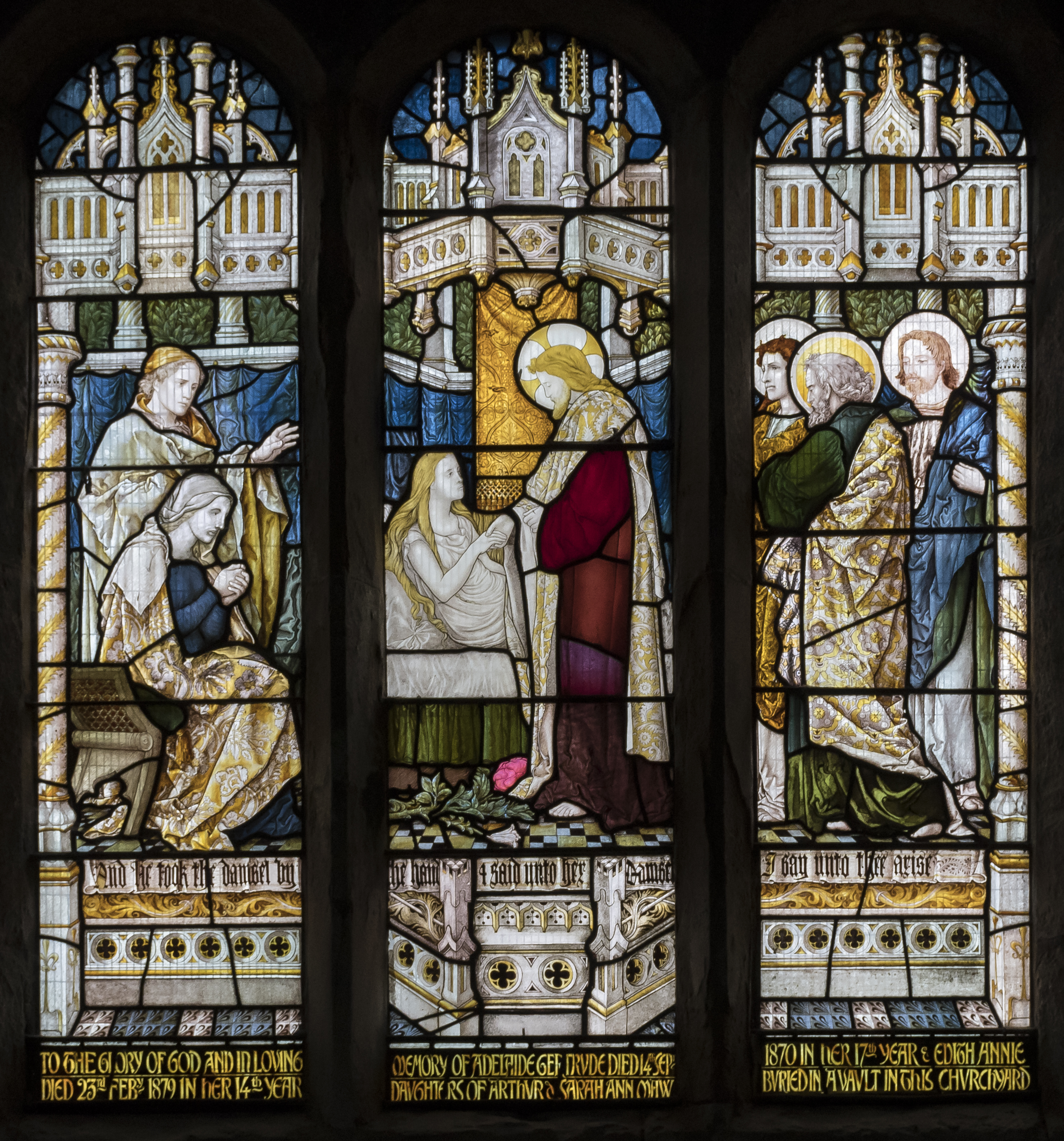
The Jairus' Daughter window in St Andrew's Church, Epworth, Lincolnshire

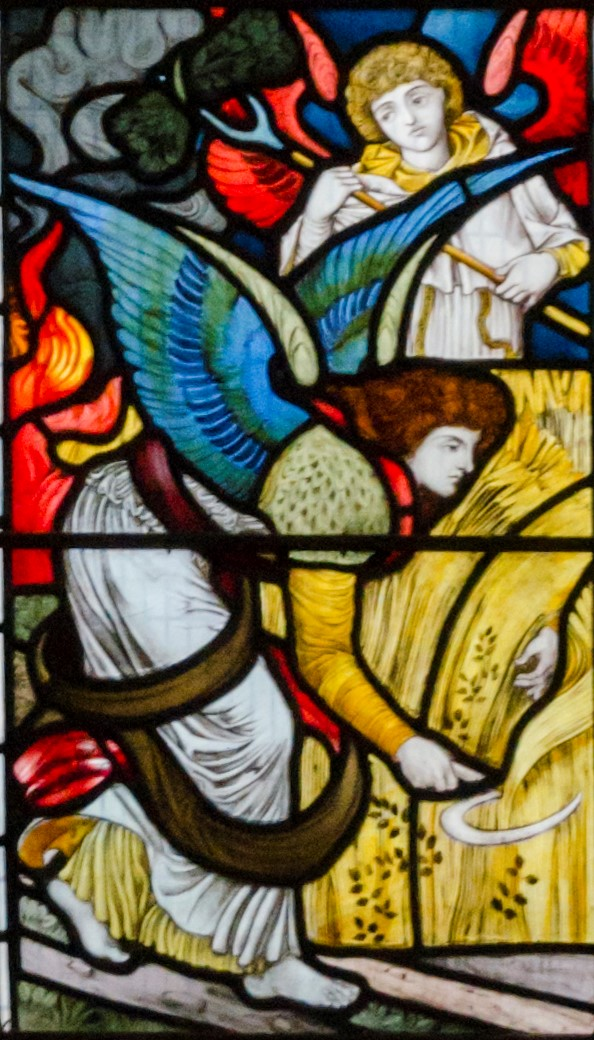
Detail of the Sower and Reaper window in St Peter and St Paul's Church, Pickering

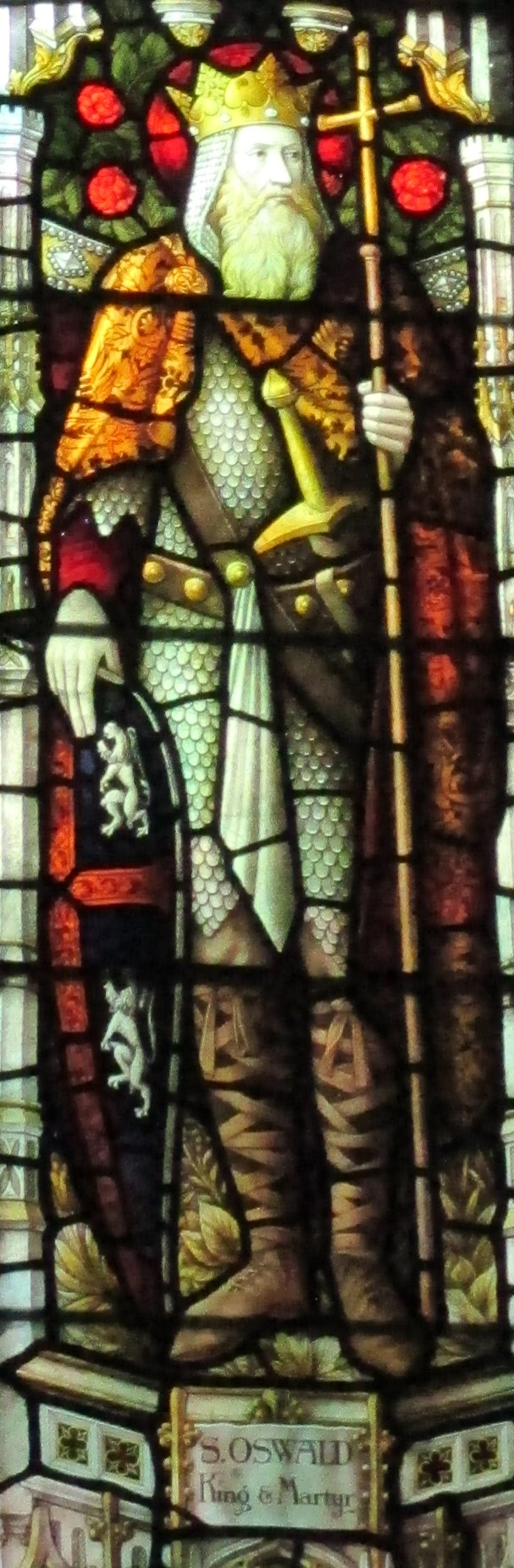
Detail of the King Oswald window in Lancaster Priory

Edward Holmes Jewitt (1849–1929) was a Pre-Raphaelite artist working in stained glass and other media. He was one of the two chief designers, along with Carl Almquist, for the Lancaster firm of Shrigley and Hunt, producers of stained-glass windows and church-fittings. In recent years his work has begun to be studied and admired, though claims that he was a genius have not gone uncontested.

== Ancestry and youth ==
Edward Jewitt's grandfather, Arthur Jewitt, authored books on the subjects of local history, perspective and geometry. One of his uncles, Llewellynn, was a wood-engraver, art historian, journalist and antiquary; another, Orlando, was also a wood-engraver, specialising in the illustration of works on Gothic architecture. A third brother, Henry, was an employee of Orlando, and Henry's son Edward was thus brought up in a family of working artists well-versed in church history and church architecture. Jewitt was born and brought up in Headington, Oxfordshire, and after the age of eight in London. Nothing is known of his formal education or initial employment, but in September 1877 he was taken on as a stained-glass designer by Arthur William Hunt of the Lancaster firm of Shrigley and Hunt.

== Career ==
The firm already had a chief designer in the young Carl Almquist, but Jewitt was given equal status with him. Hunt, Almquist and Jewitt worked as a close team, using Aesthetic techniques derived, in Almquist's case, from Edward Burne-Jones via Henry Holiday, and in Jewitt's case from Burne-Jones and Dante Gabriel Rossetti. For the first few years they usually worked separately; later they worked out a system by which Jewitt either supervised or himself painted a watercolour from which Almquist could produce a more detailed cartoon. The qualities Jewitt brought to the partnership included a sensitivity to the qualities of the stained-glass raw materials, a thorough knowledge of iconography, and a psychological realism in drawing biblical figures. Together, Almquist and Jewitt developed a house style of subtle colours (becoming richer in later years) and delicate drawing which defined Shrigley and Hunt until well into the 20th century. Jewitt designed many windows for locations in the Home Counties, the East Midlands, Yorkshire, and above all the north-west of England, and there are scattered examples elsewhere. There are also examples of painted tiles, murals, reredoses and patternwork by him, and on at least one occasion he restored medieval wall-paintings.

== Personal life ==
Jewitt married Edith Maria Pike in Lancaster Priory in 1878. Their children included Austin Jewitt, who worked for Shrigley and Hunt on design projects from 1900 to 1902; Edward's nephew, the sculptor Clement William Jewitt, also executed one commission for the firm. Edward Jewitt at first lived in Lancaster, before moving first to Morecambe and then to the coastal village of Hest Bank, five miles north of Lancaster, from where he used to walk to work every day, much to the annoyance of his employer who would have preferred him to spend more of the day at his desk. He was still working for the firm at the time of his death, in 1929.
