= Berwyn Heights, Maryland =

- Town
- The Berwyn Heights Town Office

- Flag Seal
- Motto: A Tree City, U.S.A.
- Location of Berwyn Heights, Maryland
- Coordinates: 38°59′38″N 76°54′44″W
- Country: United States of America
- State: Maryland
- County: Prince George's
- Town: Town of Berwyn Heights
- Founded: 1888
- Incorporated: 1896

Government
  - Type: Town council
  - Mayor: Tiffany Papanikolas
  - Mayor Pro Tem: Edgar Moctezuma
  - Councilmembers: David Wolfinger, Roger Gaines, Chris Brittan-Powell

Area
  - Town: 0.69 sq mi (1.80 km^{2})
  - Land: 0.69 sq mi (1.80 km^{2})
  - Water: 0 sq mi (0.00 km^{2})
  - Urban: 0.69 sq mi (1.79 km^{2})
- Elevation: 112 ft (34 m)

Population (2020)
  - Town: 3,345
  - Density: 4,817.7/sq mi (1,860.12/km^{2})
- Time zone: UTC-5 (Eastern (EST))
  - Summer (DST): UTC-4 (EDT)
- ZIP code: 20740
- Area codes: 301, 240
- FIPS code: 24-06925
- GNIS feature ID: 0597078
- Website: www.berwynheightsmd.gov

Berwyn Heights is a town in Prince George's County, Maryland, United States. Per the 2020 census, the population was 3,345. It is bordered by College Park to the west, Greenbelt to the northeast, and Riverdale Park to the south.

== History ==
Beginning in the 1870s, the area northeast of Washington, D.C. was the scene of active and continuous development as the population of the city increased and railroad suburbs such as Berwyn Heights, originally platted as Charlton Heights, gradually grew and expanded around it.

The O'Dea House, listed on the National Register of Historic Places, is one of the homes that was erected in 1888 by the Charlton Heights Improvement Company to spur development in the new subdivision.

In 1896, it became the seventh incorporated municipality in Prince George's County. In 1967, it adopted its town seal, which contains three acorns. In 1986, it was awarded the Tree City USA title.

=== Historic sites ===
A group of the remaining original houses is located around Ruatan Street. Four of the houses were built from mail-order plans made by R. W. Shoppell's Cooperative Building Plan Association of New York City. The following is a partial list of historic sites in Berwyn Heights identified by the Maryland-National Capital Park and Planning Commission:

	Site Name	Image	Location	M-NCPPC Inventory Number	Comment
1	Berwyn Heights Schoolhouse		5814 Ruatan Street	67–022–07	
2	Cissel House		8911 57th Avenue	67–022–18	
3	Cross House		5805 Ruatan Street	67–022–13	
4	Kleiner House		5603 Ruatan Street	67–022–17	
5	O’Dea House		5804 Ruatan Street	67–022–11	Listed on the National Register of Historic Places, 1987-06-04; a late Victorian pattern-book house
6	Pickett House		8616 57th Avenue	67–022–16	
7	Sportland		5933 Natasha Drive	67-005	
8	Elwood J. Taylor House		8516 58th Avenue	67–022–21	
9	Wetherald House		8411 58th Avenue	67–022–10	
10	Wolfe House		5617 Ruatan Street	67–022–15	

== Geography ==
Berwyn Heights is located at 38°59′38″N 76°54′44″W (38.993810, -76.912344). According to the United States Census Bureau, the town has a total area of 0.69 square miles (1.79 km^{2}), all land.

== Demographics ==
Historical population
Census	Pop.	Note	%±
1930	228		—
1940	453		98.7%
1950	674		48.8%
1960	2,376		252.5%
1970	3,934		65.6%
1980	3,135		−20.3%
1990	2,952		−5.8%
2000	2,942		−0.3%
2010	3,123		6.2%
2020	3,345		7.1%
U.S. Decennial Census; 2010 2020

=== Racial and ethnic composition ===
Berwyn Heights town, Maryland – Racial and ethnic composition Note: the US Census treats Hispanic/Latino as an ethnic category. This table excludes Latinos from the racial categories and assigns them to a separate category. Hispanics/Latinos may be of any race.
Race / Ethnicity (NH = Non-Hispanic)	Pop 2000	Pop 2010	Pop 2020	% 2000	% 2010	% 2020
White alone (NH)	2,008	1,483	1,279	68.25%	47.49%	38.24%
Black or African American alone (NH)	340	415	402	11.56%	13.29%	12.02%
Native American or Alaska Native alone (NH)	16	8	4	0.54%	0.26%	0.12%
Asian alone (NH)	252	261	266	8.57%	8.36%	7.95%
Native Hawaiian or Pacific Islander alone (NH)	0	4	1	0.00%	0.13%	0.03%
Other race alone (NH)	28	7	30	0.95%	0.22%	0.90%
Mixed race or Multiracial (NH)	56	100	163	1.90%	3.20%	4.87%
Hispanic or Latino (any race)	242	845	1,200	8.23%	27.06%	35.87%
Total	2,942	3,123	3,345	100.00%	100.00%	100.00%

=== 2020 census ===
As of the 2020 census, Berwyn Heights had a population of 3,345. The median age was 35.6 years. 23.2% of residents were under the age of 18 and 12.6% of residents were 65 years of age or older. For every 100 females there were 107.9 males, and for every 100 females age 18 and over there were 109.7 males age 18 and over.

100.0% of residents lived in urban areas, while 0.0% lived in rural areas.

There were 1,017 households in Berwyn Heights, of which 39.5% had children under the age of 18 living in them. Of all households, 51.0% were married-couple households, 19.2% were households with a male householder and no spouse or partner present, and 23.1% were households with a female householder and no spouse or partner present. About 17.0% of all households were made up of individuals and 9.0% had someone living alone who was 65 years of age or older.

There were 1,048 housing units, of which 3.0% were vacant. The homeowner vacancy rate was 1.0% and the rental vacancy rate was 5.3%.

=== 2010 census ===
At the 2010 census there were 3,123 people, 1,002 households, and 681 families in the town. The population density was 4,526.1 inhabitants per square mile (1,747.5/km^{2}). There were 1,051 housing units at an average density of 1,523.2 per square mile (588.1/km^{2}). The racial makeup of the town was 56.0% White, 15.1% African American, 0.8% Native American, 8.4% Asian, 0.1% Pacific Islander, 14.4% from other races, and 5.1% from two or more races. Hispanic or Latino of any race were 27.1%.

Of the 1,002 households 34.3% had children under the age of 18 living with them, 50.1% were married couples living together, 11.0% had a female householder with no husband present, 6.9% had a male householder with no wife present, and 32.0% were non-families. 20.1% of households were one person and 7.6% were one person aged 65 or older. The average household size was 3.10 and the average family size was 3.42.

The median age in the town was 34.9 years. 21.7% of residents were under the age of 18; 12.1% were between the ages of 18 and 24; 31.1% were from 25 to 44; 24.3% were from 45 to 64; and 10.8% were 65 or older. The gender makeup of the town was 52.4% male and 47.6% female.

=== 2000 census ===
At the 2000 census there were 2,942 people, 1,022 households, and 713 families in the town. The population density was 4,552.9 inhabitants per square mile (1,757.9/km^{2}). There were 1,047 housing units at an average density of 1,620.3 per square mile (625.6/km^{2}). The racial makeup of the town was 71.79% White, 12.00% African American, 0.54% Native American, 8.57% Asian, 8.23% Hispanic or Latino, 4.38% from other races, and 2.72% from two or more races. of the population.

Of the 1,022 households 27.5% had children under the age of 18 living with them, 54.8% were married couples living together, 10.1% had a female householder with no husband present, and 30.2% were non-families. 19.3% of households were one person and 7.7% were one person aged 65 or older. The average household size was 2.86 and the average family size was 3.19.

The age distribution was 20.9% under the age of 18, 10.7% from 18 to 24, 33.1% from 25 to 44, 22.5% from 45 to 64, and 12.9% 65 or older. The median age was 36 years. For every 100 females, there were 103.9 males. For every 100 females age 18 and over, there were 100.2 males.

The median household income was $65,744 and the median family income was $69,013. Males had a median income of $42,525 versus $34,831 for females. The per capita income for the town was $25,793. About 0.9% of families and 5.5% of the population were below the poverty line, including 0.5% of those under age 18 and 1.6% of those age 65 or over.

== Education ==
Berwyn Heights Elementary School

Berwyn Heights is served by the Prince George's County Public Schools: Berwyn Heights Elementary School, which is located in Berwyn Heights, Greenbelt Middle School (Greenbelt), and Parkdale High School (Riverdale Park).

== Transportation ==
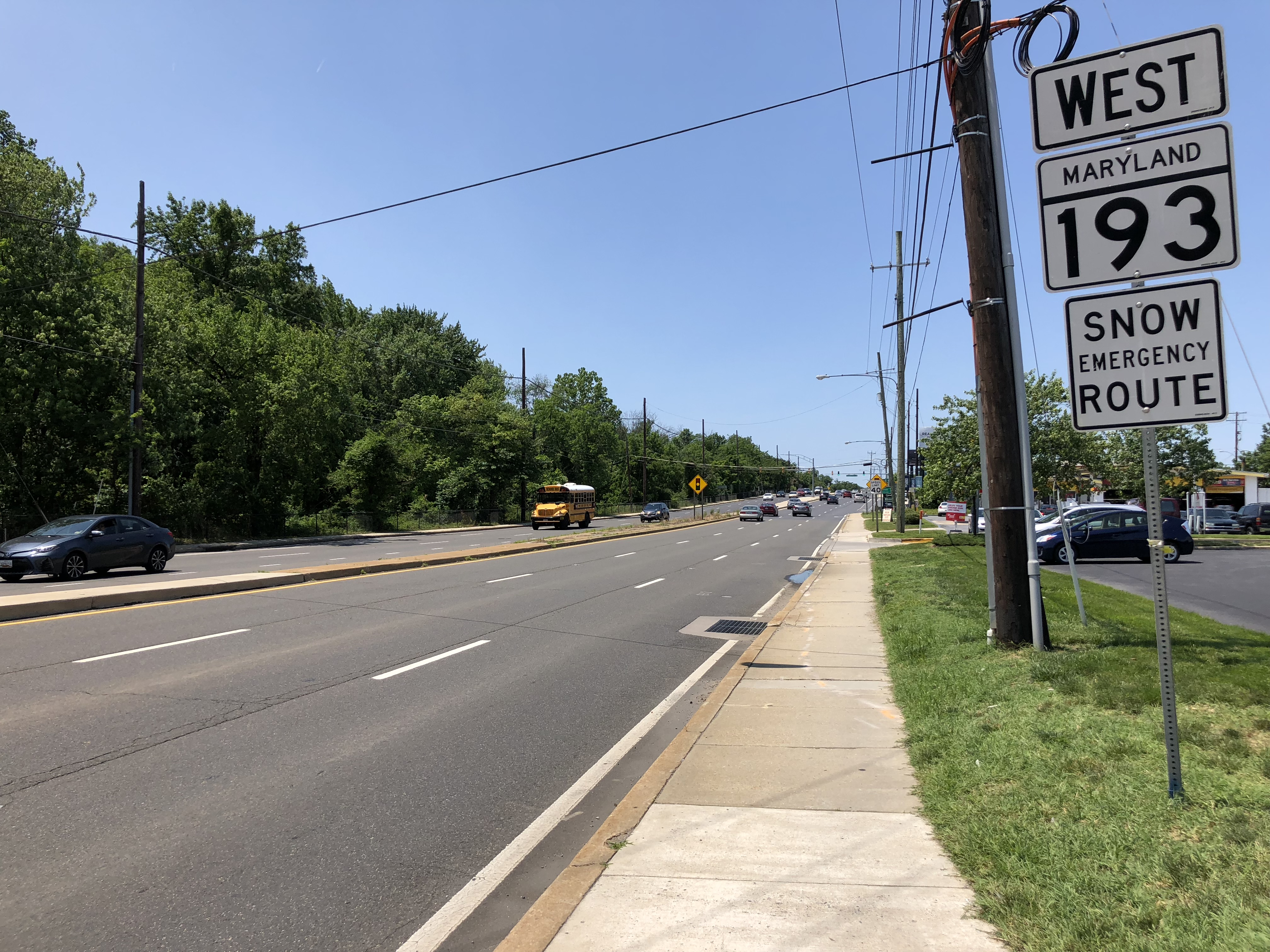
MD 193 westbound in Berwyn Heights

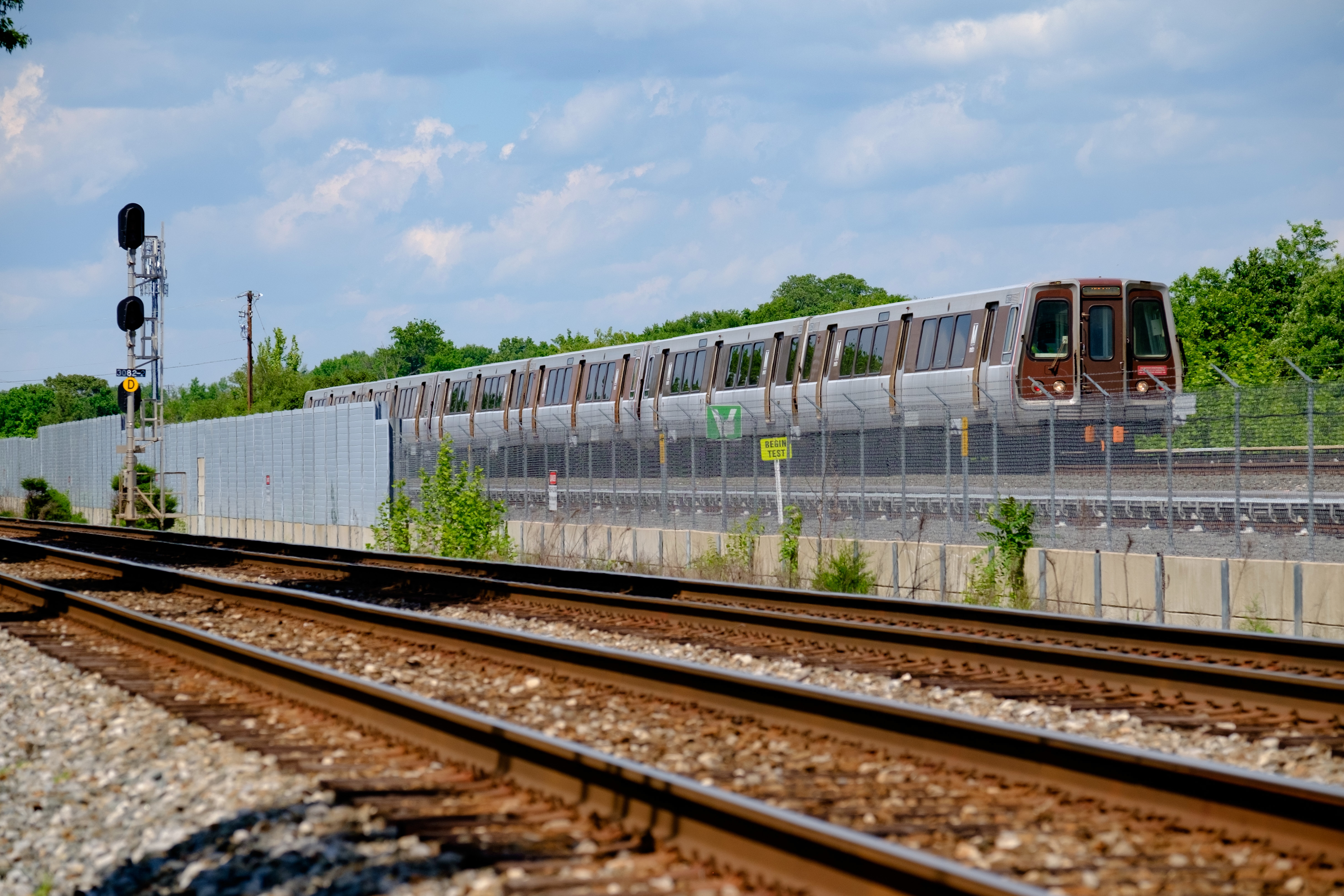
Southbound Washington Metro train running between the Greenbelt and College Park stations in May 2022.

The only state highway providing direct access to Berwyn Heights is Maryland Route 193 (Greenbelt Road). MD 193 connects eastward to Greenbelt and westward to College Park. Just east of the town limits, MD 193 has a junction with Maryland Route 201 (Kenilworth Avenue), which provides access to Interstate 95/Interstate 495 (the Capital Beltway), D.C. Route 295 (the Kenilworth Avenue Freeway), and U.S. Route 50 (John Hanson Highway).

== Government ==
The town council consists of five members, who are elected every two years on an at-large plurality voting basis, to govern the town of Berwyn Heights. The member of the council who received the most votes during the election becomes mayor. The mayor serves as the head of the government and presides at all council meetings, but in other respects is an equal member of the council. The mayor pro tempore assumes the mayoral duties in the absence of the mayor.

The current mayor is Tiffany Papanikolas. The town manager is Kyle Snyder.

The town has a police department, a public works department, a code enforcement department, and an administration department.

=== Past Mayors ===
- 1948–1952 Robert F. Burnette
- 1952–1954 Charles G. Durbin
- 1954–1956 Robert F. Burnette
- 1956–1958 John P. Wintermoyer
- 1958–1960 H. Dale Smith
- 1960–1962 Clinton D. Walker
- 1962–1966 George E. Lauterbach
- 1966–1968 Kenneth C. Styers
- 1968–1972 Harry L. Ballew
- 1972–1974 George E. Lauterbach
- 1974–1976 Jadie B. Mc Dougald, first elected mayor after change from commissioner government to mayor and council form of government.
- 1976–1978 Harry L. Ballew
- 1978–1980 Jadie B. Mc Dougald
- 1980–1982 Howard G. Wood
- 1982–1992 William T. Armistead Jr.
- 1992–1998 Thomas J. Love
- 1998–2000 William T. Armistead Jr.
- 2000–2001 Tawanna P. Gaines
- 2001–2002 Ronald M. Shane
- 2002–2003 Bradley S. Jewitt
- 2003–2004 Patricia D. Dennison
- 2004–2015 Cheye M. Calvo
- 2015–2016 Jodie Kulpa-Eddy
- 2016–2018 Cheryl Jewitt
- 2018 Christopher J. Rasmussen (May 9 to July 16, 2018, resigned)
- 2018 Lynn White (July 16, 2018, to December 6, 2018, resigned)
- 2018–2020 Stephen Isler
- 2020–2022 Amanda Dewey
- 2022–2024 Jodie Kulpa-Eddy
- 2024–Present Tiffany Papanikolas

=== Taxation ===
At 53 cents per $100 per assessed value, Berwyn Heights has one of the lower real property tax rates in Prince George's County. In 2005, the town became the first municipality in Maryland to establish a public safety taxing district, after it was authorized by the general assembly. The district imposes a special tax on businesses to fund the cost of one full-time officer and helps maintain around the clock police coverage.

=== County government ===
Prince George's County Police Department District 1 Station in Hyattsville serves Berwyn Heights.

== Civic activities ==
The town also benefits from numerous town committees and organizations. The town, as of October 2008, has joined a State Retirement Pension, for its employees, and police officers. This was done in order to try to compete and to retain the police officers.

Sports Park, which is the home of a Berwyn Heights civic group, is located by Indian Creek.

Berwyn Heights Day is a yearly event that celebrates the founding of the town.

== See also ==
- Berwyn Heights, Maryland mayor's residence drug raid
