= Jewett =

Jewett may refer to:

== Places ==
=== United States ===
- Jewett House, a dormitory of Vassar College
- Jewett, Illinois
- Jewett, Minnesota
- Jewett, Missouri
- Jewett, New York
- Jewett, Ohio
- Jewett, Texas
- Jewett, Wisconsin
- Jewett City, Connecticut

== People ==
- Jewett (surname)
- Jewett Campbell (1912–1999), American painter, teacher

== Other uses ==
- Jewett staging system, a system for describing the state of prostate cancer
- Jewett (automobile), the name of an automobile manufactured by the Paige-Detroit Motor Car Company from 1923 to 1926
- Jewett Car Company, an Ohio manufacturer of street cars
- Jewett Arts Center, art gallery at Wellesley College in Wellesley, Massachusetts
- Jewett Gallery, art gallery at Main Library in San Francisco, California

== See also ==
- Jewitt
