= Lillien Jane Martin =

American psychologist, botanist and botanical collector (1851–1943)

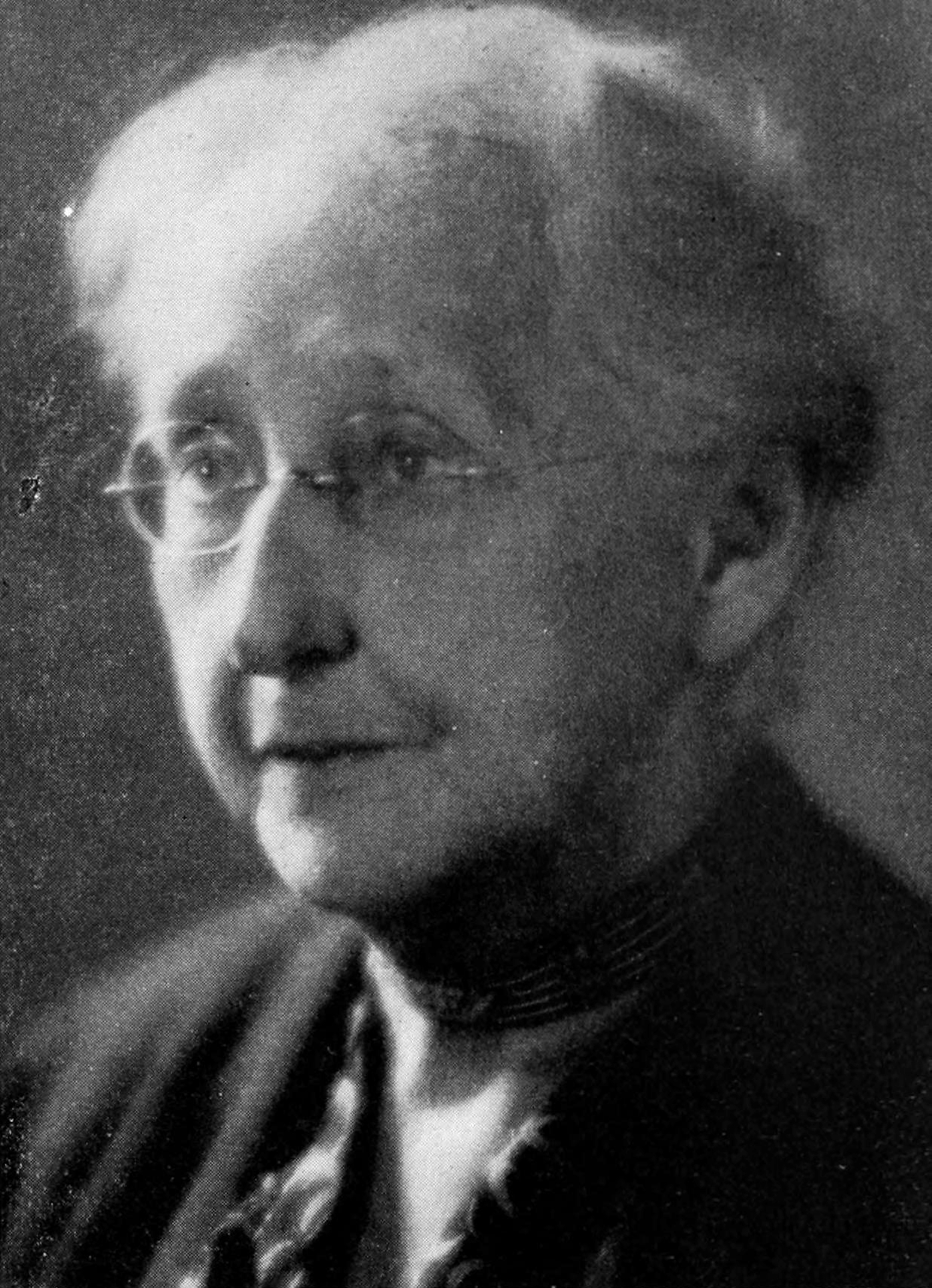
- Martin c. 1940
- Born: July 7, 1851; Olean, New York
- Died: March 26, 1943 (aged 91); San Francisco, California
- Education: University of Göttingen
- Alma mater: Vassar College
- Occupation: Psychologist
- Notable work: Salvaging Old Age (1930); Sweeping the Cobwebs (1933)
- Awards: Honorary doctorate University of Bonn

Lillien Jane Martin (1851–1943) was an American psychologist. She published over twelve books. Martin experienced ageism and sexism as an early woman in psychology.

== Early life and education ==
Lillien Jane Martin was born on July 7, 1851, at Olean, New York. At the age of four, she entered the nearby Olean Academy. At the age of sixteen, her talents were recognized such that she became a teacher at a girls' school in Wisconsin. By the age of 26, in 1876, she had earned enough money to return to her native New York where she enrolled at Vassar College at Poughkeepsie, New York.

Martin obtained her A. B. from Vassar College in 1880, and taught as a high school science teacher in San Francisco, California. She then studied at the University of Göttingen from 1894 until 1898. She was awarded an honorary degree from the University of Bonn in 1913. Previously, the University of Bonn had declined to admit her because she was a woman.

== Professional career ==
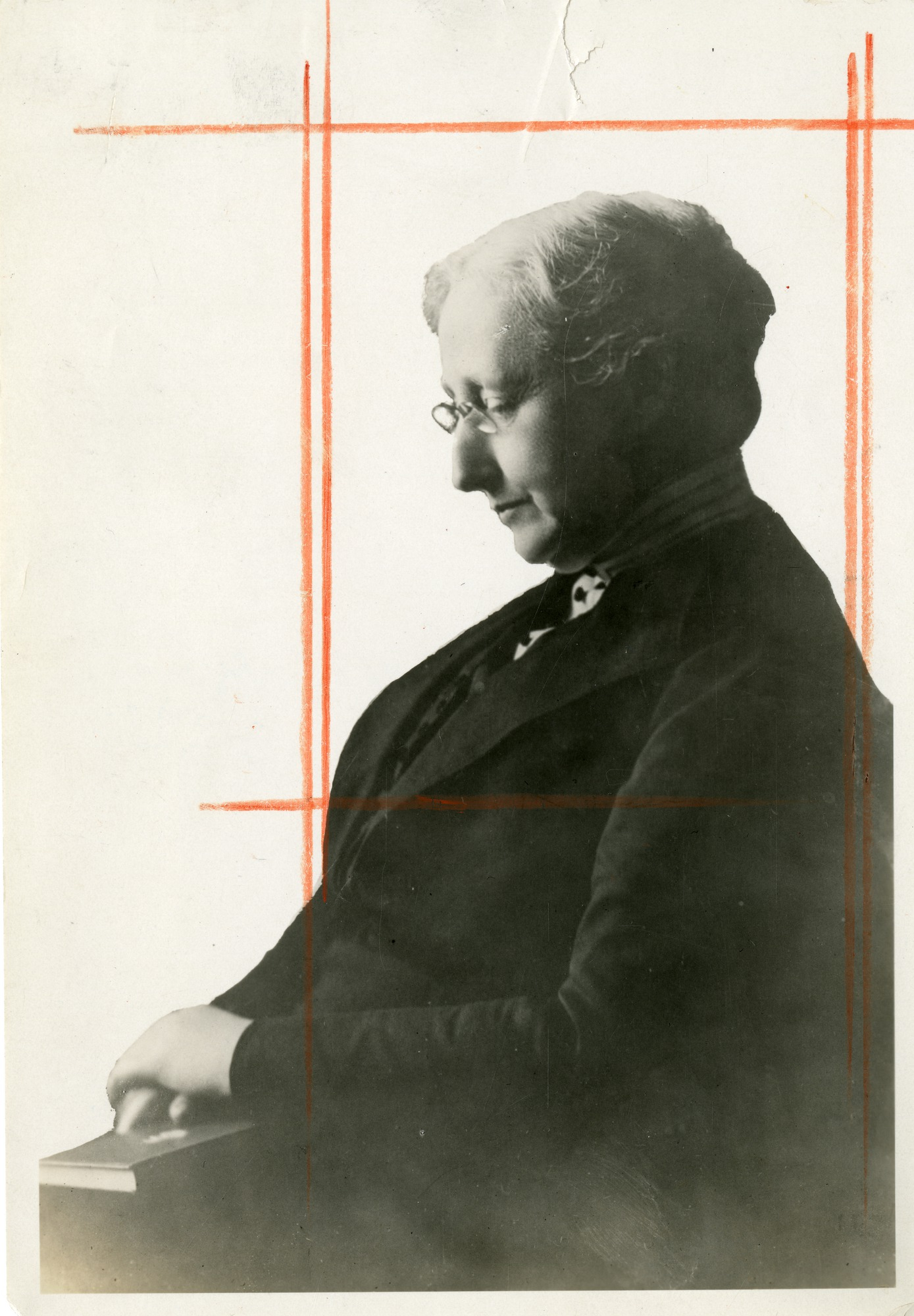
Lillien Jane Martin, undated

She started teaching psychology at Stanford University in 1899. In 1906, she briefly shared a house in Palo Alto with William James. That April, both lived through the San Francisco Earthquake, which severely damaged the house and destroyed many buildings on campus. Martin and James soon toured the ruined city together.

After leaving Stanford in 1916, Martin became a consulting psychologist and psychopathologist. She was the head of a mental health clinic in San Francisco. This mental health clinic was the first in the world for elderly people and non-handicap children.

She was president of the California Society for Mental Hygiene; member of the Kongress fur experimentelle Psychologie; fellow of the American Psychological Association and of Sigma Xi.

She was the author of "Around the World with a Psychologist" and many other works on psychology, including Mental Hygiene and Mental Training of the Pre-School Age Child.

She was a member of the Century Club of California, the American Association of University Women, the San Francisco Woman's City Club, the San Francisco Woman's Club.

== Personal life ==
She lived in Indiana, and moved to California in 1895. She lived at Shreve Building, San Francisco, California. A memorial bench for her and her long-time companion Fidelia Jewett (October 3, 1851 – June 21, 1933) was initially positioned in front of their apartment building, and it was later moved to Golden Gate Park.
