= Berwyn Heights, Maryland mayor's residence drug raid =

2008 police raid in Maryland

Coordinates: 38°59′19.73″N 76°54′28.38″W

The drug raid at the residence of Cheye Calvo, then-mayor of Berwyn Heights, Maryland, was a controversial action taken by the Prince George's County Sheriff's Office and Police Department on July 29, 2008. The raid was the culmination of an investigation that began in Arizona, where a package containing 32 pounds (15 kg) of marijuana was intercepted in a warehouse, addressed to the mayor's residence. Instead of confiscating the package, police allowed it to be delivered. Upon arrival, a SWAT team raided the house and held Calvo and his mother-in-law at gunpoint, and shot and killed his two dogs, one as it attempted to run away.

The event gained national and international media attention. While the Calvos were cleared of wrongdoing, the police were accused by the Calvo family and civil rights groups of lacking a proper search warrant, using excessive force, and failure to conduct a proper background investigation of the home being raided—the investigation was so cursory that the sheriff's office was unaware that Calvo was the mayor. Despite the criticisms, no action has been taken against the officers or their respective police departments. In August 2010, Sheriff Michael A. Jackson stated that: "We've apologized for the incident, but we will never apologize for taking drugs off our streets. Quite frankly, we'd do it again. Tonight."

== Raid ==
On July 29, 2008, a SWAT team from the Sheriff's Office, agents of the State of Maryland, executing a search warrant and assisting the separate County Police, conducted a raid on the home of Berwyn Heights Mayor Cheye Calvo. The raid was initiated after the Mayor brought a package delivered by the SWAT team into his home. A drug-sniffing dog in Arizona had determined that the package—addressed to the Mayor's wife—contained 32 pounds (15 kg) of marijuana. While taking control of the residence, Sheriff's deputies shot Calvo's two pet Labrador Retrievers, including one who was cited by Calvo to be running away from officers. Calvo and his mother-in-law were handcuffed and questioned for several hours, with Calvo wearing just underwear.

== Response of law enforcement agencies ==
The incident received wide coverage in the United States and abroad. Immediately following the raid, both the Sheriff's Office and County Police stated that the Berwyn Heights raid was proper because of the large quantity of drugs involved.

On August 7, 2008, Mayor Calvo called for a federal investigation of the incident by the U.S. Department of Justice. The local chapter of the National Association for the Advancement of Colored People (NAACP) also requested an investigation. In early August, the Federal Bureau of Investigation (FBI) began a civil rights investigation into the incident.

On August 8, 2008, the County Police cleared the Calvos of any wrongdoing relating to the drug shipment. Chief of Police Melvin High called the Calvos "innocent victims" who were caught up in the drug trafficking ring. While High said he regretted the loss of the Calvo's dogs, he did not apologize for the actions taken by his officers.

In a press conference on the same day as High's exoneration, Sheriff Michael A. Jackson defended the conduct of the deputies who conducted the raid. However, an internal investigation was launched as with any incident involving the discharge of a deputy's weapon. The results of the investigation, released on September 4, 2008, concluded the conduct of the deputies was appropriate and no wrongdoing was committed. According to the report, the first dog was shot after "engaging an officer" and the second was seen "running towards a second officer" and shot as well.

As of December 2008, the county police has indicated their investigation is not complete. The FBI is still monitoring the situation. In August 2010 while campaigning to be elected county executive, Sheriff Jackson stated, "We've apologized for the incident, but we will never apologize for taking drugs off our streets....Quite frankly, we'd do it again. Tonight."

== Criticism of police actions ==
=== Improper search warrant ===
During the interrogation, Calvo repeatedly requested to see the search warrant, but his lawyer stated no copy was provided until three days later. A County Police spokesman initially stated that a no-knock warrant had been issued for Calvo's home. However, after Calvo's lawyer challenged that statement and media published copies of the warrant, the commander of the county's narcotics enforcement division stated that no-knock warrants do not exist in the county. However, no-knock warrants were clarified in a 2005 law, sponsored by Baltimore Delegate Curt Anderson, that limits their use to suspects fleeing into a house, or if a suspect is considered armed or is attempting to destroy evidence.

=== Lack of a background investigation ===
During interrogation, Calvo stated that officers did not believe he was the Mayor and for a time refused his request that they contact the Berwyn Heights Police Department (which was unaware of the raid) to confirm his identity. Police Chief High stated his department did not know the home was owned by the mayor and his wife.

Patrick Murphy, chief of police for the Berwyn Heights Police Department, was especially critical of the county police. Murphy argued that the raid could have been prevented if his department had handled the situation, stating "you can't tell me the chief of police of a municipality wouldn't have been able to knock on the door of the mayor of that municipality, gain his confidence and enter the residence". Furthermore, according to Mayor Calvo, a memorandum of understanding between the county and the city requires county police to inform the city if an operation is being conducted within their jurisdiction.

=== Use of excessive force ===
In an editorial a week after the shooting, The Washington Post criticized the actions of police officers as "a Keystone Cops operation from start to finish", alluding to the lack of proper execution by the sheriff's office's SWAT team. Additionally, groups such as the Cato Institute were critical of the operation and used it as an example of the dangers of the war on drugs and the militarization of local police departments in the United States. Marc Fisher of the Post also related this incident to the growing prevalence of SWAT units, even in small jurisdictions, noting a massive increase in the amount of SWAT deployments since the mid-1980s.

Further criticism was leveled against the sheriff's office's deputies for the shooting of Calvo's two dogs. Contrary to the official internal investigations conducted by the sheriff's office and the county, Calvo stated his dogs were not a threat to the deputies. To support his claims, Calvo paid for a necropsy to be conducted on each dog by the Maryland Department of Agriculture. According to the results, one dog was shot four times, including twice in the head and chest. The other dog was shot twice, including once in the back of the leg which bolsters Calvo's argument that the dog was fleeing and that the force used was "unbelievably excessive". This version of events was also confirmed by the later testimony of a law enforcement officer present at the raid.

== Aftermath ==
=== Later arrests ===
Prince George's County Police later arrested two men in a drug trafficking plan involving the shipment of large parcels of marijuana to addresses of uninvolved residents. After each parcel was delivered outside the addressee's home, another individual would retrieve the drugs. Police seized six packages containing 417 pounds (189 kg) of marijuana.

=== Internal investigation ===
On June 19, 2009, the Prince George's County Sheriff's Office issued a report of an internal investigation that cleared its deputies of any wrongdoing in the Berwyn Heights raid. Prince George's County Sheriff Michael Jackson said during a press conference that the findings of the report "are consistent with what I've felt all along: My deputies did their job to the fullest extent of their abilities....In the sense that we kept these drugs from reaching our streets, this operation was a success." Jackson's explanation did not address the fact that the package was intercepted in the FedEx warehouse and delivered under police supervision.

During the press conference, Jackson gave the first apology for the raid by a county official. "I am sorry for the impact this has had on Mayor Calvo, Ms. Tomsic and Ms. Porter and for the loss of their family pets," Jackson said. "It is extremely unfortunate that a felonious drug trafficker involved this family in his criminal enterprise."

In response to the report, Cheye Calvo issued the following statement: "By commending his deputies for their actions, the Sheriff is placing other innocent families and innocent family pets at risk. There is no excuse for the no-knock entry into our home, the killing of Payton and Chase, and the prolonged handcuffing of my mother-in-law and myself."

=== Lawsuit ===
A lawsuit was filed in June 2009 against Prince George's County Sheriff Michael Jackson; Detective Shawn Scarlata; the state of Maryland; Prince George's County; and two "John Doe" deputy sheriffs, whose names were not immediately released. In depositions, law enforcement personnel admitted that at least one of the dogs was running away when shot. In January 2011, the suit was settled out of court for an undisclosed amount of money and various SWAT reforms.

=== Legislation ===
In 2009, Mayor Cheye Calvo proposed a measure that would require every Maryland police department that operates a SWAT team to submit biannual reports on its activities, including where and when it was deployed and whether an operation resulted in arrests, evidence seizures, or injuries. The bill passed that same year, despite strong opposition from Maryland's police agencies. Maryland was the first state to adopt such legislation; Utah became the second when it passed a similar bill in March 2014.
