= Fidelia Jewett =

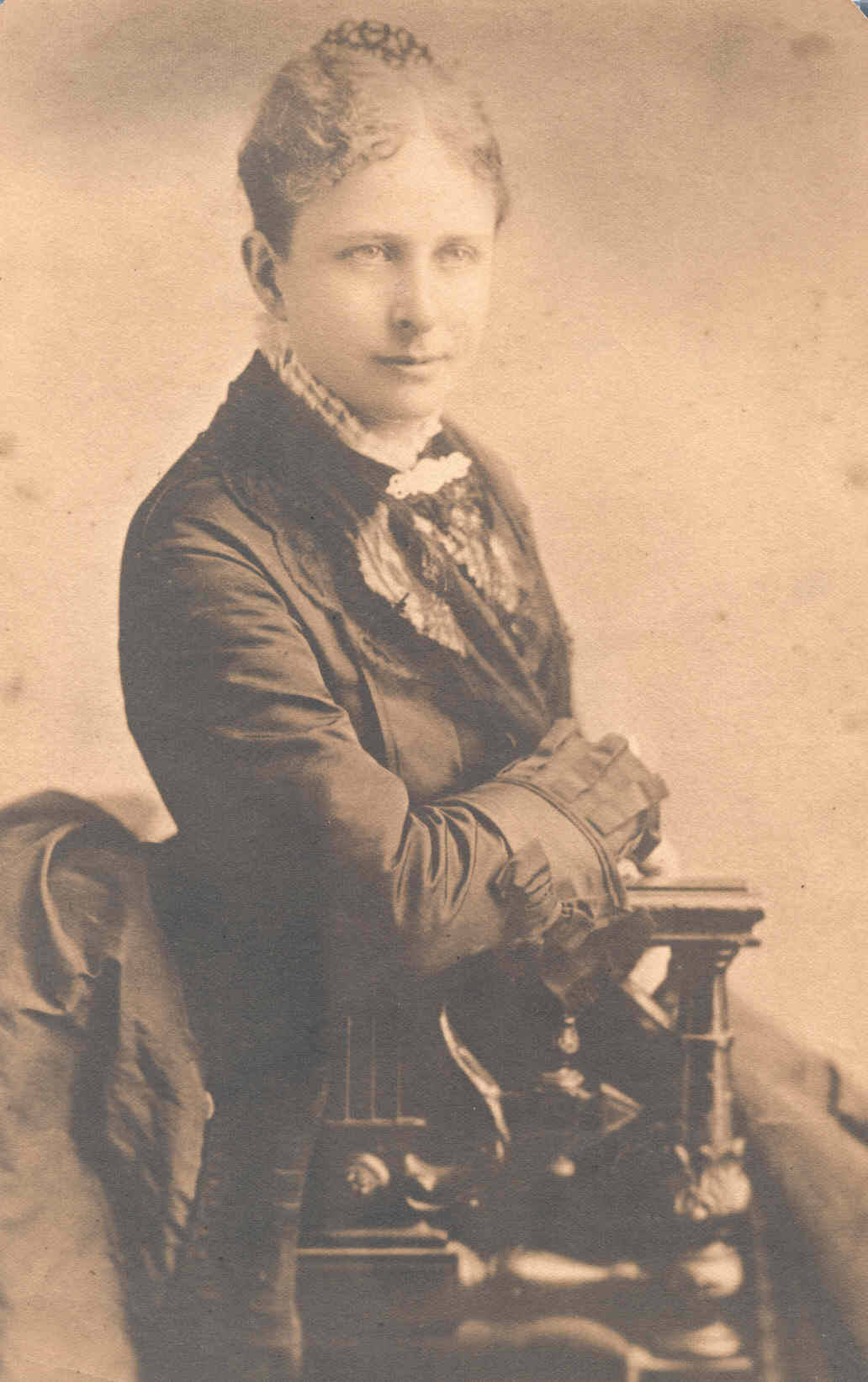
Fidelia Jewett

Fidelia Jewett (October 3, 1851 – June 21, 1933) was an American mathematics and botany teacher in San Francisco, longtime companion of Lillien Jane Martin. Jewett was also one of the first benefactors of William Henry Holtzclaw, founder of Utica Institute, the first African American college in Mississippi founded by an African American. Jewett Hall at Grambling State University in Louisiana is named after her.

== Biography ==
Fidelia Jewett was born on October 3, 1851, in Weybridge, Vermont, the daughter of Solomon Wright Jewett (1808-1894) and Mary Catharine Jewett (1819-1891). The Jewett family were California pioneers, and for that account, pioneers in practically every State of the Union. The Jewett family reunion happened in 1915 at the Panama–Pacific International Exposition in San Francisco. Sixty or more delegates joined from the East, while every State was represented and many in attendance were from California. Fidelia Jewett read a paper on The Early Jewett Pioneers of California, telling how they were lured in California by the discovery of gold and how they had aided in the upbuilding of the State.

Since the 1880s, Jewett taught mathematics and botany without a college degree. While a teacher at the Girls High School in San Francisco in 1889, Jewett met Lillien Jane Martin who was hired as vice principal and head of the science department. In 1894, Martin resigned and moved to Göttingen, Germany, to earn a doctoral degree; Jewett joined her during the 1895/96 academic year.

Back in the United States, Jewett resumed her teaching at the Girls High School. When Martin returned in 1898, she was temporarily without income, waiting for her position as teacher of psychology at Stanford University to start: Jewett gave Martin half of her salary until Stanford paid Martin. Martin later encouraged Jewett to earn a college degree.

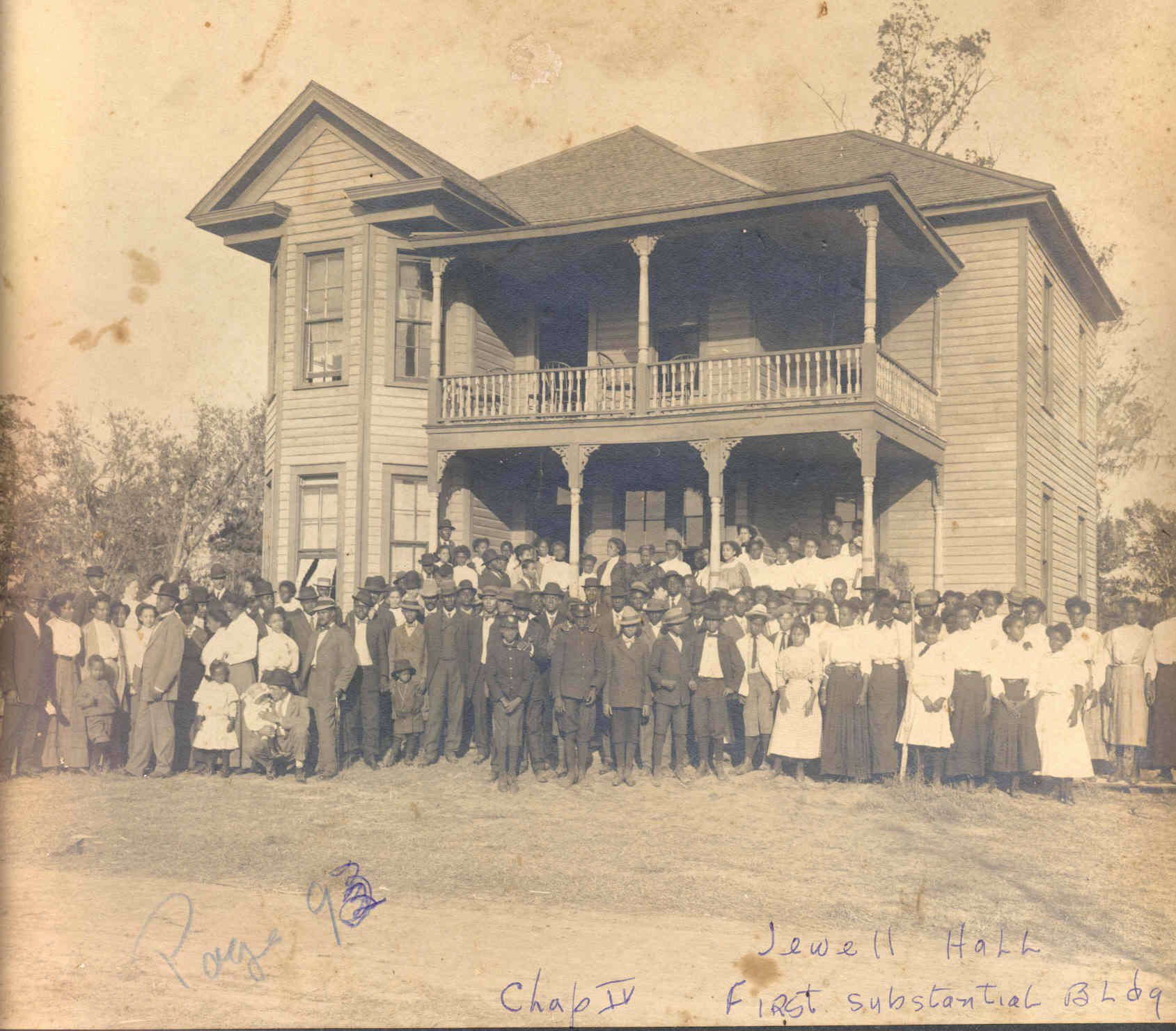
Jewett Hall the first substantial building donated by Miss Fidelia Jewett

In 1903, Jewett was one of the earliest benefactors of William Henry Holtzclaw, the founder of the Utica Institute in Utica, Mississippi, the first school of higher education for African Americans founded by an African American in Mississippi. In 1900, Jewett donated Jewett Hall to Utica, the first substantial building of the institute. Utica Junior College merged with Hinds Junior College in 1982. In 1939, Jewett Hall at Grambling State University, the only institution of higher learning available to African Americans in north Louisiana from 1939 to 1960, was named after Fidelia Jewett, who visited and continuously gave money to Grambling. In 2010, Jewett Hall, with Long-Jones Hall, Eddie Robinson Museum, Lee Hall, Men's Memorial Gym, T.H. Harris Auditorium, Brown Hall, University Police Building, and Foster-Johnson Health Center were added to National Register of Historic Buildings.

After the death of Jewett, her longtime companion Lillien Jane Martin, paid for a 12-foot-long speckled granite bench with the inscription: "Fidelia Jewett (October 3, 1851-1933), A Public School Teacher in San Francisco, For Almost Fifty Years, A Founder in Salvaging Old Age". On the base at the rear of the bench another inscription reads "Lillien J. Martin (1851-1943), Guide the Child, Salvage the Old." Originally the bench was in Union Square, San Francisco, near the apartment Martin shared with Jewett in the Shreve Building; it was installed in 1933 at a cost of US$2,000. When in 1946 the square was replanned, the bench was moved to Golden Gate Park and is now facing the South Lake.

== See also ==
- Solomon Jewett — Fidelia's half-brother by her father's first wife
