= O'Dea House (Berwyn Heights, Maryland) =

Historic house in Maryland, United States

- U.S. National Register of Historic Places
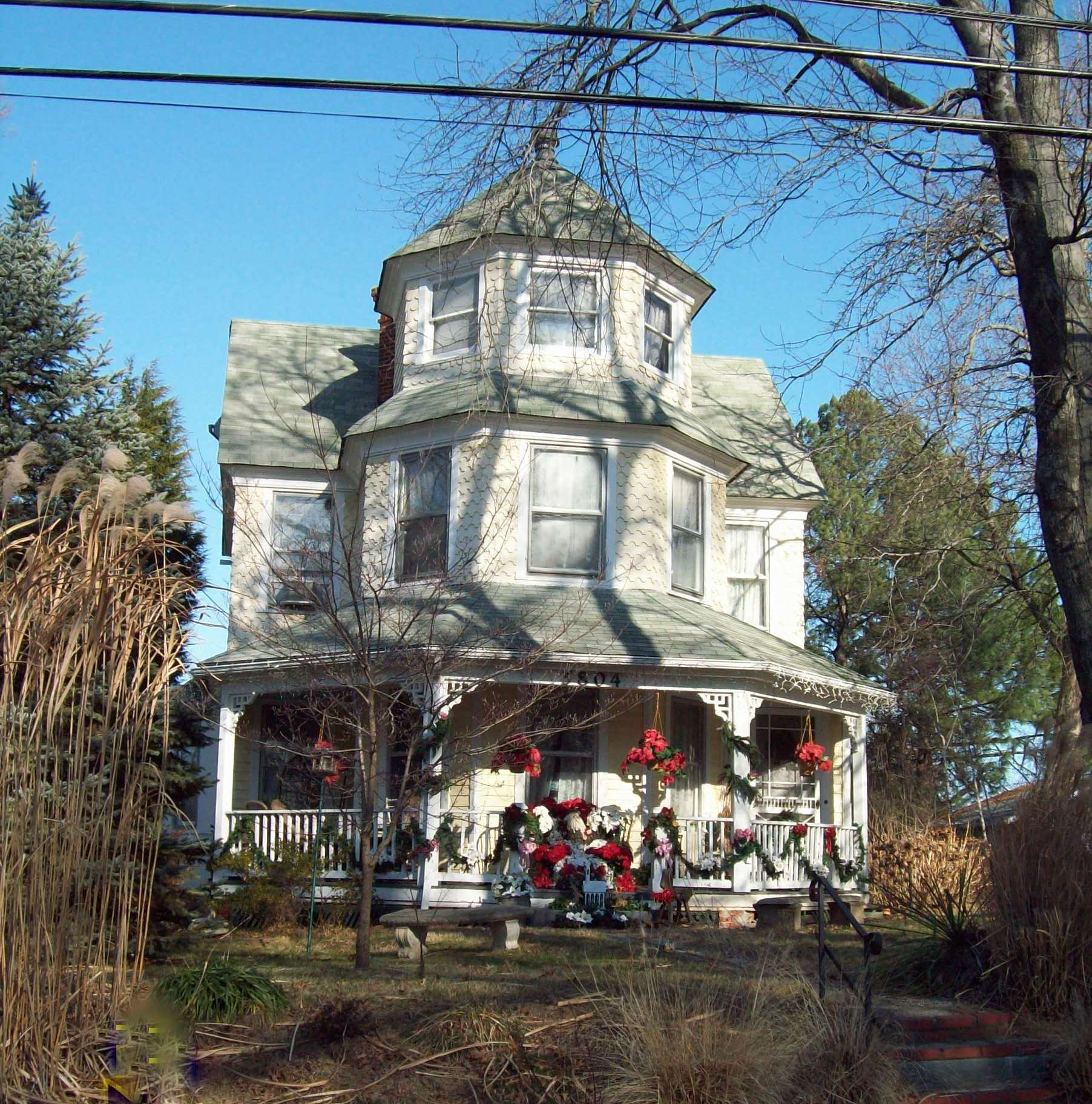
- O'Dea House, Berwyn Heights, Maryland, December 2008

- Location within Maryland Location within the United States
- Location: 5804 Ruatan St., Berwyn Heights, Maryland
- Coordinates: 38°59′41″N 76°54′47″W
- Built: 1888
- Architect: Charlton Heights Improvement Co.
- Architectural style: Queen Anne
- NRHP reference No.: 87000899
- Added to NRHP: June 04, 1987

The O'Dea House, is a historic home located in Berwyn Heights, Prince George's County, Maryland, United States. The house was built in 1888 from a pattern book design and is a 2 1/2-story frame Queen Anne-style dwelling. Most notable of its features is the three-story octagonal tower and varied ornamental surface coverings.

The O'Dea House is significant for its association with the development of Berwyn Heights, originally Charlton Heights, an early streetcar suburb of Washington, D.C. and for its architectural character. Beginning in the 1870s, the area northeast of Washington was the scene of active and continuous development as the population of the city increased and railroad suburbs such as Berwyn Heights gradually grew and expanded around it. The O'Dea House is one of the houses erected by the Charlton Heights Improvement Company to spur development of its new community. In typical fashion, these company-built houses were often mail order or pattern book houses. The pattern for the O'Dea House is from an 1888 published design by Robert W. Shoppell.

The O'Dea House was listed on the National Register of Historic Places in 1987. It was sold in 1939 to Lawrence and Alice O'Dea, and bears their name.
