= Prince George's County Police Department =

Primary law enforcement agency in Prince George's County, Maryland, U.S.

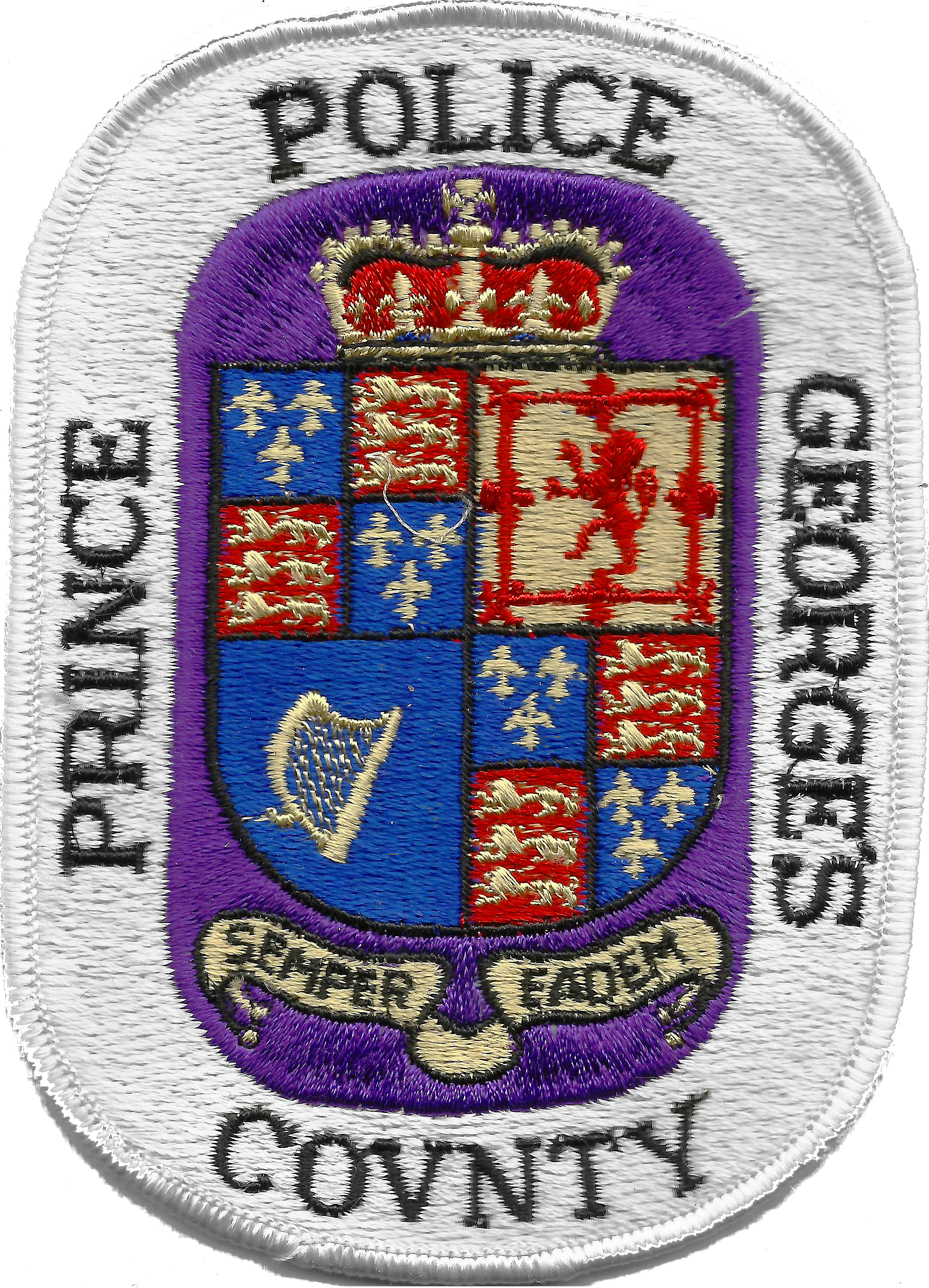
- Patch

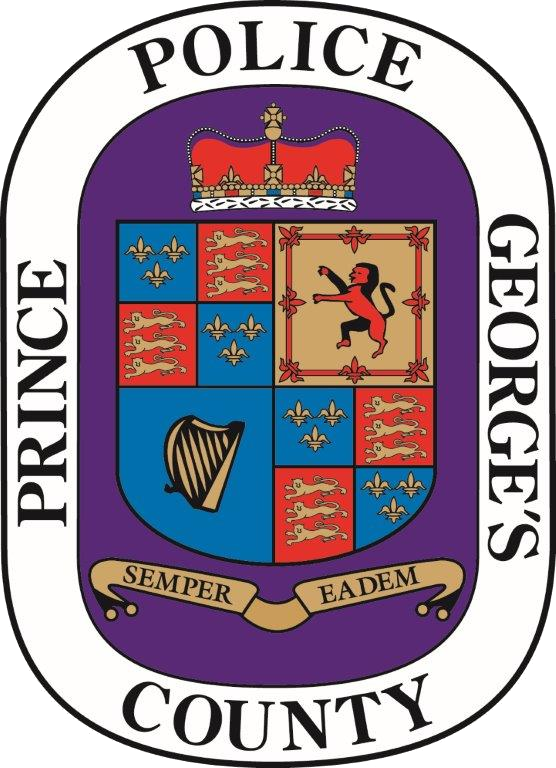
- Seal

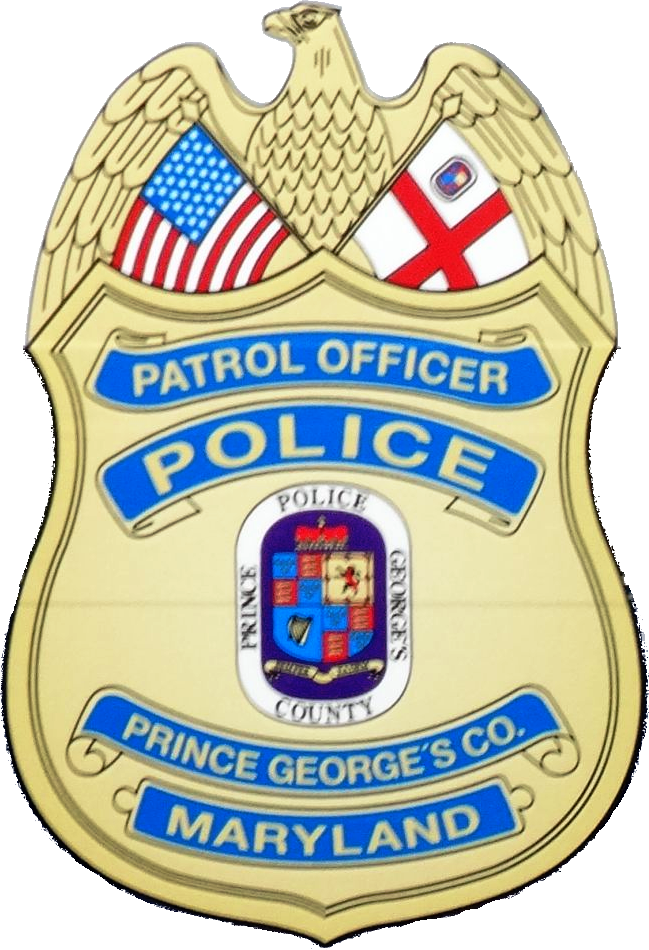
- Badge of a PGPD officer
- Common name: Prince George's County Police Department
- Abbreviation: PGPD

Agency overview
- Formed: June 1, 1931; 95 years ago
- Employees: 2,100 Approx. as of 2026
- Annual budget: $465,753,200 million

Jurisdictional structure
- Operations jurisdiction: Prince George's County, Maryland, U.S.
- Map of Prince George's County Police Department's jurisdiction
- Area: 498 square miles (1,290 km^{2})
- Population: 960,000
- General nature: Local civilian police

Operational structure
- Headquarters: 8801 Police Plaza, Upper Marlboro, MD 20772
- Police officers: 1,800 Approx. as of 2026
- Civilians: 300 Approx. as of 2026
- Agency executive: George Nader, Chief of Police
- Stations: 8

Facilities
- Headquarters: 8801 Police Plaza Upper Marlboro, MD 20772; 38°55′5″N 76°52′35″W
- Jails: 1
- Police boats: 5
- Helicopters: 4

Website
- Prince George's County Police Department

The Prince George's County Police Department (PGPD) is the primary law enforcement agency in Prince George's County, Maryland in the United States, servicing a population of over 960,000 residents and visitors within 499 square miles (1292.4km^{2}) of jurisdiction.

The department headquarters is in the Upper Marlboro area of Upper Marlboro, a census-designated place.

== History ==
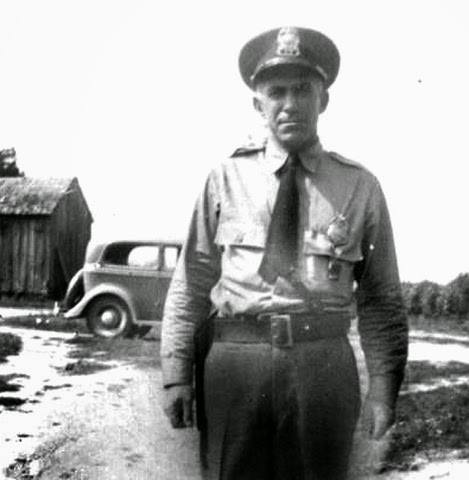
Edward Merson, the first PGPD policeman killed on duty.

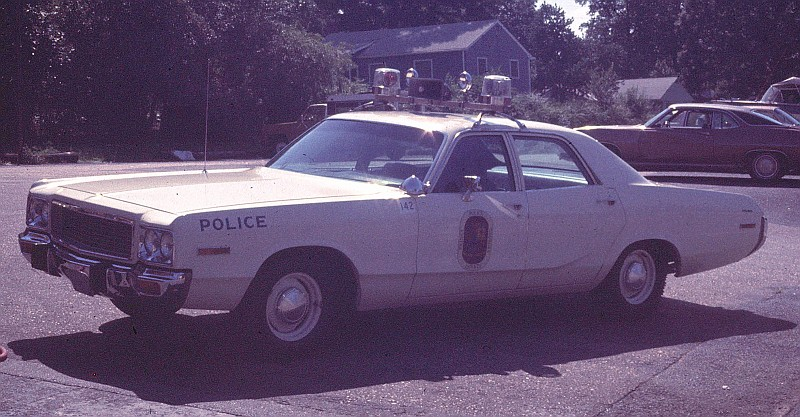
PGPD 1973 Dodge Polara patrol car in the 1970s.

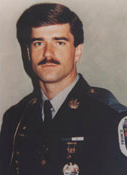
Mark Murphy, a PGPD sergeant killed in 1988.

The Prince George's County Police Department was created on June 1, 1931, in response to the increasing population and crime the county was experiencing. Prior to 1931, the county was primarily policed by the Prince George's County Sheriff's Office (PGSO). When serious crimes, such as murder or rape, were committed, detectives from the Baltimore City Police Department were borrowed.

On June 26, 1978, Officer Albert Marshal Claggett IV and Officer James Swart were shot and killed with Claggett's revolver by Terrence Johnson (February 27, 1963 - February 27, 1997), a 15-year-old theft suspect, while in the booking area of the Hyattsville District Station. Johnson was found guilty of manslaughter in the death of Officer Claggett and not guilty by reason of insanity in the death of Officer Swart. Johnson was sentenced to 25 years in prison; he was paroled in 1995. on February 27, 1997, Johnson and his brother Darryl robbed a bank in Aberdeen, Maryland. As police officers approached to arrest him, Johnson committed suicide on his 34th birthday.

On February 8, 1982, Officer Raymond Hubbard was shot and killed when he intervened in an armed robbery while off duty at Iverson Mall. While shopping at the mall Officer Hubbard observed an armed robbery in progress at a jewelry store. He drew his weapon and confronted the suspects. Unbeknownst to Officer Hubbard, there were accomplices nearby who opened fire on him. Officer Hubbard was struck several times and fell to the ground. The suspects then stood over him and shot him several more times before stealing his service revolver. All four suspects were eventually apprehended and convicted of Officer Hubbard's murder. Three were sentenced to life and one was sentenced to 70 years in prison. Officer Hubbard had served with the Prince George's County Police Department for 2 years and previously served for the U.S. Air Force from 1975 to 1979.

In August 1988, Corporal Mark Kevin Murphy was shot while he attempted to force open a door during a drug raid. As Murphy knelt down to position equipment, someone inside the home opened the door. Murphy's partner and childhood best friend, Cpl. Gary Sommers, then opened fire hitting Murphy in the back of the head.

Around 1988 when the Maryland State Police went to Beretta, the Prince George's County Police Department started to replace their revolvers with the 9mm Beretta 92.

In July 1999, the department was subject to a complaint by the United States Department of Justice (DOJ) regarding alleged excessive use of force by police canine units.

In January 2004, the department signed a Memorandum of Agreement (MOA) with the U.S. Department of Justice over allegations of excessive force. This resulted in the establishment of an independent monitoring group by Military Professional Resources Inc. (MPRI), a defense contractor.

On June 21, 2005, Sergeant Steven F. Gaughan was killed during a traffic stop in Laurel.

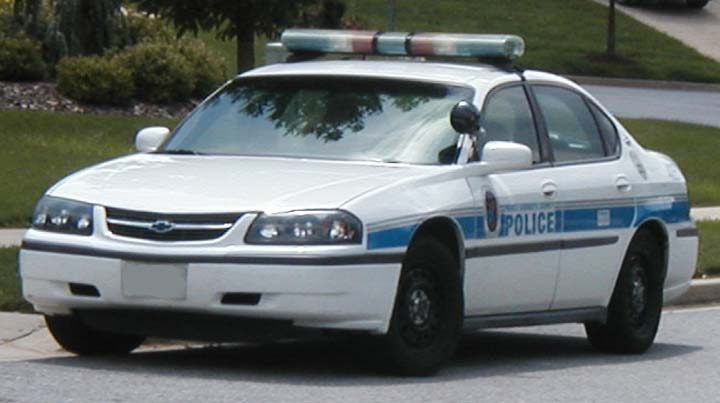
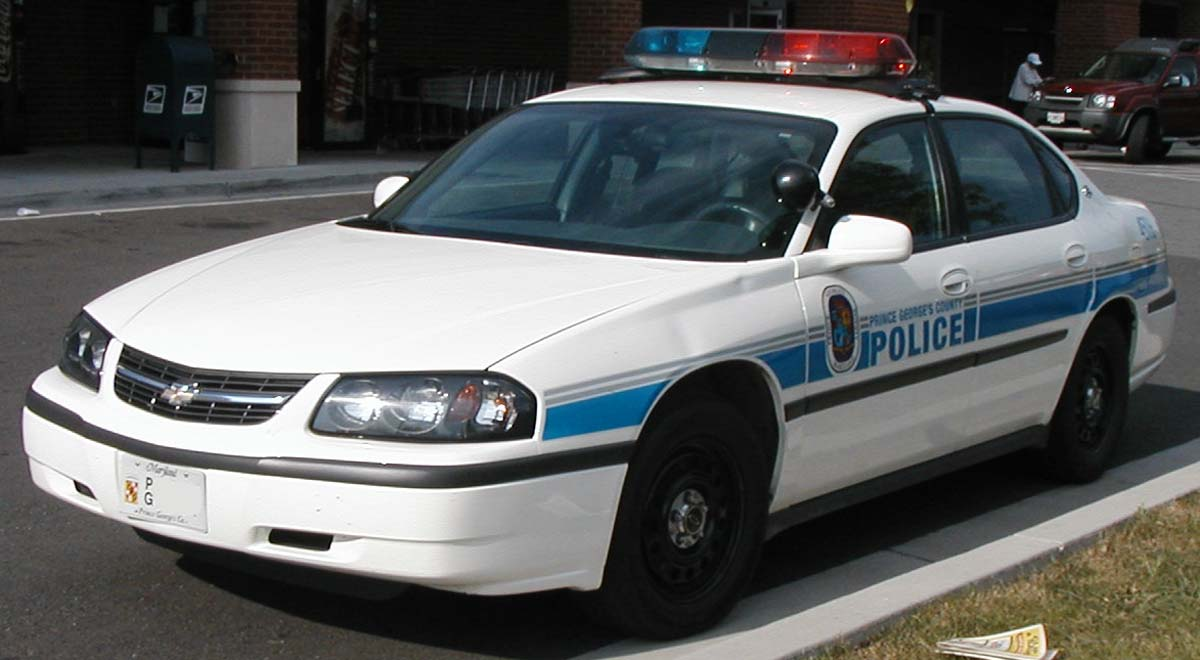
Chevrolet Impalas of the Prince George's County Police in 2006.

On June 27, 2008, Corporal Richard S. Findley was killed by Ronnie L. White, who was driving a stolen pickup truck. White struck Corporal Findley with the truck as he attempted to elude police and avoid being arrested in Laurel. White appeared to be in good physical condition when he was arrested but died of asphyxiation while in the custody of the Prince George's County Department of Corrections. The death was ruled a homicide. The Prince George's County Police investigated the crime; suspects included several guards. A cell video camera, which would have recorded the incident was either disabled or obstructed. There were no arrests.

On July 29, 2008, the PGCPD, together with the Prince George's County Sheriff's Office, raided the residence of the Mayor of Berwyn Heights. The mayor was cleared of wrongdoing, while the police were heavily criticized for their actions.

On October 23, 2008, the county and three individually named police officers were found not liable for use of excessive force by a jury after deliberating for twenty minutes. The claim involved injuries sustained by a University of Maryland student who was involved in a riot following a victory over Duke University in basketball in 2005. The student was struck near the eye allegedly by a projectile fired from a FN 303 less-than-lethal riot gun.

On March 9, 2010, Private First Class Tom Jensen died at Prince George's Hospital Center after being taken there following a vehicular crash. He was responding to a man breaking into a woman's apartment on February 27, 2010. Due to his over five years of service in the department, he was posthumously promoted to corporal.

On October 9, 2010, an instructor at the Prince George's Police Academy, was transferred out of the academy. Reportedly, he had given all of his recruits perfect scores on tests, even though students' actual scores varied, and at least some students had failed those exams. There was evidence that he shared exam questions with students in advance, allowing several classes of recruits to graduate after cheating on their exams.

On February 3, 2012, Corporal Donald Taylor allegedly struck Ryan Dorm with the butt of his service weapon. The pistol fired from the impact with Dorm's face. Taylor then allegedly filed a report falsely claiming Dorm had somehow attacked him. A surveillance video at the Brentwood, Maryland gas station showed this to be false and in September 2012, Taylor was charged with second-degree assault, reckless endangerment, providing a false statement to police and misconduct in office. Dorm, who had been arrested on various charges had all charges against dropped after being jailed for four months. Cpl Donald Taylor was charged with assault and misconduct in office. He was found not guilty and acquitted of all charges after a trial.

In May 2012, Officer Daniel Gonzalez was arrested for driving under the influence of alcohol after crashing his official car. Gonzalez was found not guilty of all charges after a trial.

In July 2012, Corporal Rickey Adey was indicted by a grand jury on charges of assaulting a teenaged boy during an arrest. Adey was acquitted of the charges after a trial.

On August 20, 2012, Officer Adrian Morris died as a result of an automobile accident on the Washington, D.C. Capital Beltway, near Route 212. Officer Michael Risher was also injured but survived, according to the police department. Morris, who was driving the police cruiser, was attempting to catch up to another vehicle while investigating a reported crime. The police cruiser apparently veered off the highway and into a ravine. Morris, who was thrown from the vehicle, suffered severe head injuries. He was pronounced dead at Prince George's Hospital. Morris, 23, was a former member of the Prince George's Police Explorers.

In April 2014, Officer Sinisa Simic was sentenced to ten years' confinement for his protection of a gang distributing cocaine and untaxed cigarettes. Simic had been indicted on various charges in 2010 as part of a wide-ranging corruption investigation that lead to the arrest of three other officers.

In March 2021, the department hired Dallas law enforcement veteran Malik Aziz as its new chief of police. The previous chief, Hank Stawinski, resigned on June 18, 2020, following a report that found widespread patterns of racism throughout the department.

In 2023, a video surfaced. It shows a uniformed Prince George's County police officer going into the back of a marked police car with a woman.

== Organization ==
The current Chief of Police is George Nader, who is the 20th chief. The previous Chief of Police, Malik Aziz, resigned in 2025.

As of 2010, the agency has an authorized strength of 1,786 sworn officers and 317 civilians.

The agency is divided into eight districts. Each district is divided into sectors, which are divided into individual beats:

- District I (Hyattsville: Adam and Baker sector),
- District II (Bowie: David and Edward sector),
- District III (Palmer Park: George sector),
- District IV (Oxon Hill: John and King sector),
- District V (Clinton: Frank sector),
- District VI (Beltsville: Charlie sector)
- District VII (Fort Washington: William sector)
- District VIII (Forestville: Henry sector)

=== Organizational structure ===
- Bureau of Administration
- Bureau of Forensic
- Bureau of Homeland Security
- Bureau of Investigation
- Bureau of Patrol

=== Specialized units ===
As of January 1, 2014, each districts has various units in it as listed below.

==== Bureau of Patrol ====
- Patrol Squads/shifts
- Special Assignment Teams
- COPS Squads (Community Oriented Policing Services)
- Bicycle Patrol Trained Officers

==== Regional Investigative Division ====
Divided into 3 regions North (Hyattsville/Beltsville), Central (Bowie/Landover), South (Clinton, Oxon HIll) Each region has its own detectives:

- Robbery Suppression Team Detectives
- Property Crimes Section Detectives
- Crimes Against Persons Detectives

==== Special Operations Division ====
- Emergency Services Team (SWAT)
- Canine Unit (K-9)
- Traffic Enforcement Unit
- Collision Analysis and Reconstruction Unit
- Motors Unit
- Marine Unit
- Honor Guard
- Conflict Negotiator Team
- Civil Disturbance Unit
- Special Events Planning Section
- Automated Enforcement Division
- National Harbor Unit
- Aviation Unit - Operates four MD520N helicopters, equipped with FLIR, with the first airframe acquired around June 2000 and registered in September 2000, with additional ones added in 2017.

==== Criminal Investigation Division ====
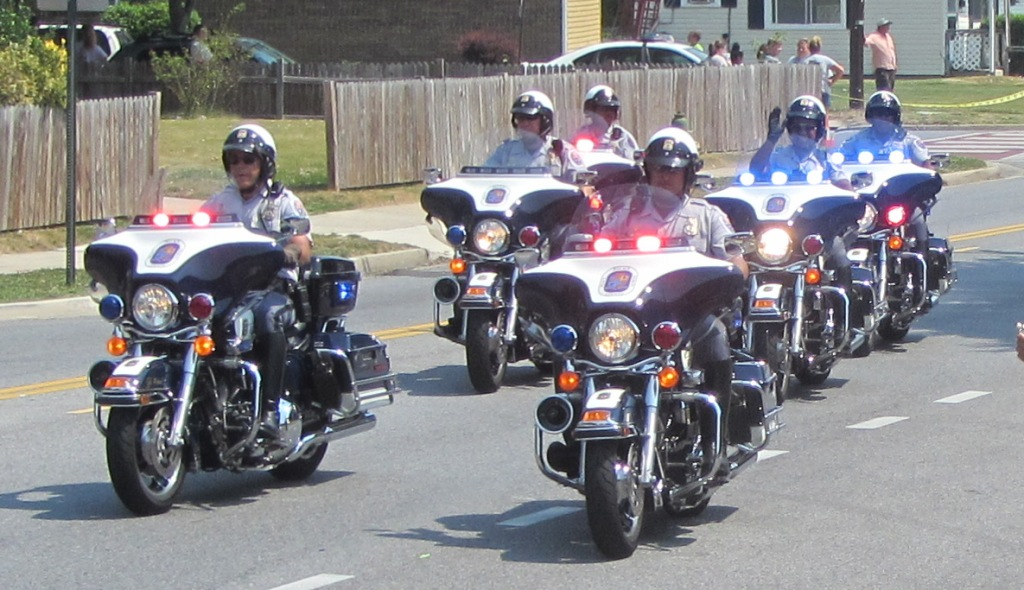
PGPD motorcycle units in July 2012.

- Homicide Unit
- Commercial Robbery Unit
- Sex Crimes Section
- Child & Vulnerable Adult Abuse Section
- Domestic Violence Unit

==== Crime Scene Investigation Division ====
- Evidence Section
- DNA Analysis Lab
- Firearms Examination Unit
- Drug Analysis Lab -
- Computer Data Recovery Unit

==== Special Investigation Division ====
- Washington Area Vehicle Enforcement Team/Auto Theft Task Force
- GANG Unit
- Pawn Unit
- Commercial Retail Theft Investigation Unit
- Scrap/Precious Metals Investigation Unit
- Violent Crime Impact Section/ VCU
- Environmental Crimes Unit
- Financial Crimes Unit
- ROPE

==== Internal Affairs Division ====
- Internal Affairs
- Special Investigative Response Team
- Administrative Hearing Board Unit
- Court Liaison Unit

==== Narcotics Enforcement Division ====
- Major Narcotics Section
- Street Narcotics Section

==== Bureau of Support Services ====
- Recruitment and Selection Unit
- Training & Education Division - Academy
- Technology Integration Section
- Clothing & Supply Unit
- Property Management Division
- Records Section
- Community Services Division
- Professional Compliance Section
- Intelligence Division

== Uniform and rank structure ==
Ribbon worn by PGPD officers to denote prior service in the U.S. military.

=== Uniform ===
The uniform of a PGPD officer consists of a light grey uniform shirt with PGPD patch on the sleeve, French blue pants with a black stripe, black shoes or boots, and a French blue 8 point cover. When wearing the winter uniform of the day a black tie is worn over a long sleeve uniform shirt. Alternatively, PGPD officers are giving the option to wear a utility uniform on patrol consisting of navy blue pants and shirt. Officers assigned to the Special Operations Division, Emergency Services Team (SWAT) are authorized to wear green utility uniforms. Badges and nameplates are gold, and all officers between the ranks of officer first class and sergeant have blue chevrons with a grey outline on each sleeve. Officers from the ranks of lieutenant to police chief wear a white shirt with gold rank insignia on the collars. The dress uniform consists the light grey shirt (white for commissioned officers), French blue pants, hi-gloss shoes, the French blue 8 point cover, and a dark blue dress blouse with French blue epaulets, pocket flaps, and piping around the sleeve.

=== Rank structure ===
The following is the rank precedence of sworn personnel in descending order:

- Chief of Police
- Assistant Chief of Police
- Deputy Chief
- Assistant Deputy Chief
- Major
- Captain
- Lieutenant
- Sergeant
- Corporal
- Police officer first class (POFC)
- Police officer

== Fleet and weapons ==
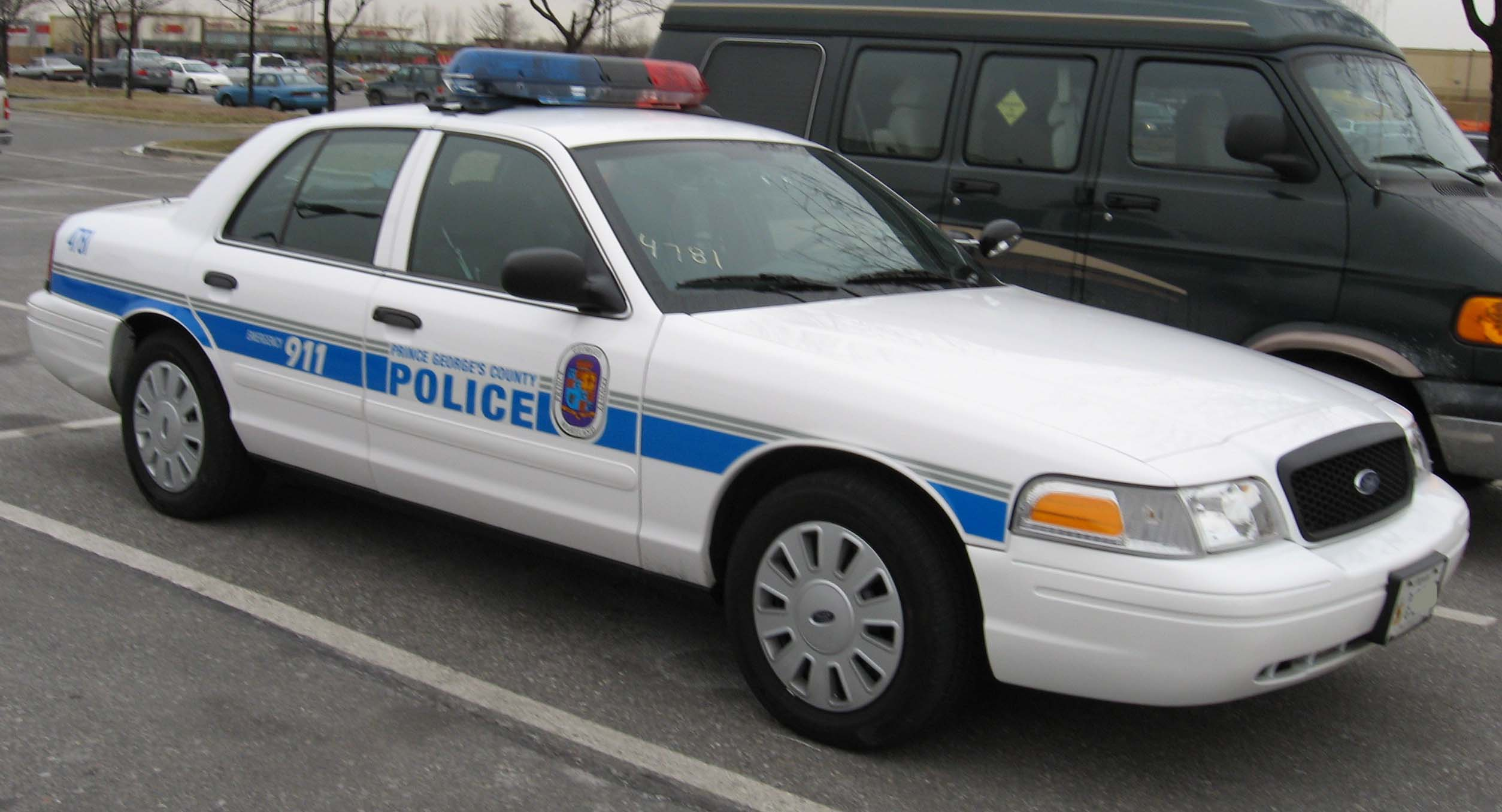
A Ford Crown Victoria Police Interceptor of the Prince George's County Police in February 2007.

The PGPD's fleet consists primarily of the Ford Police Interceptor Utility and Sedan. The Chevrolet Tahoe is also used, with the Ford Crown Victoria Police Interceptor and Chevrolet Impala 9C1 being phased out. The PGPD's service pistol is the Smith & Wesson M&P 9, chambered in 9x19mm Parabellum. AR-15 patrol rifles and shotguns are also used. The department previously used the Heckler & Koch MP5 submachinegun. In the 1980s and early 1990s, the PGPD used Dodge Diplomat police cars. During the late 1990s and early 2000s, the PGPD used the Chevrolet Lumina.

== See also ==
- Prince George's County Sheriff's Office
- List of law enforcement agencies in Maryland
- Berwyn Heights, Maryland mayor's residence drug raid
