= Solomon Jewett =

American rancher in California (1835–1905)

Solomon Jewett (March 13, 1835 – December 26, 1905) was an American rancher and pioneer in Kern County, California. He was prominent as a sheep farmer and banker together with his brother, Philo D. Jewett.

== Early life and career ==
He was born in Weybridge, Vermont on March 13, 1835. His father Solomon Wright Jewett had been a sheep farmer and dealer in Weybridge, who travelled to Europe to import sheep to the United States.

In his early career, Solomon Jewett worked as a schoolteacher in Racine, Wisconsin, and as a ferryboat operator on the Missouri River in Nebraska in 1858, and undertook an aborted journey to Pike's Peak in 1859.

== Ranching ==
At the age of eight, he drove a flock of sheep from Vermont, where he was born, to Albany, New York. He arrived in San Joaquin Valley, California, in 1860, and from there moved to Kern County. Jewett trailed herds of Merino sheep into California, first raising sheep on the Tejon ranch. He then formed a partnership with his brother Philo D. Jewett, at the 40,000 acres (16,000 ha) Rio Bravo ranch north of Kern. In 1874, they sold their land and flocks to the Wool Growers' Association, and moved to land north of Bakersfield, which became known as Jewett's Lane.

Solomon then bought land north of Bakersfield and large flocks of sheep, which he finally sold in 1899, after which he switched to cattle.

== Farming ==
In 1865, Jewett planted cotton and built a cotton gin in Kern County, shipping the output to Alameda to be manufactured into fabric. In 1865 they were growing 130 acres (53 ha) of cotton there, sending it to Oakland for ginning.

He had in the meantime diversified into alfalfa farming, at three plots: one 640 acres (260 ha) at the Beardsley Canal, one 640 acres (260 ha) one at the McCaffery Canal, and one 320 acres (130 ha) one at the Emory ditch.

== Other enterprises ==
In addition, he opened the first general store in Bakersfield, established its first bank, and founded the Buena Vista Oil Company, which later became the Jewett Oil Company. He was founding co-president of the Kern Valley Bank, which opened in 1874 on the corner of 18th Street and Chester Avenue in Bakersfield.

His partnership Jewett & Blodgett secured rights of way for railroads to be laid to the oil field in McKittrick to Maricopa.

In 1872 he was chairman of the county board of supervisors in Bakersfield, when the county seat moved there.

== Death and legacy ==
He died in Bakersfield, California on 1905-12-06.

The Kern County Wool Growers' Association sold Rio Bravo on to Louis C. Olcese and John Barker, and after operating as a sheep ranch into the 20th century it was later the home of Merle Haggard.

== See also ==
- Fidelia Jewett — Solomon's half-sister by his father's second wife
