= William Henry Holtzclaw =

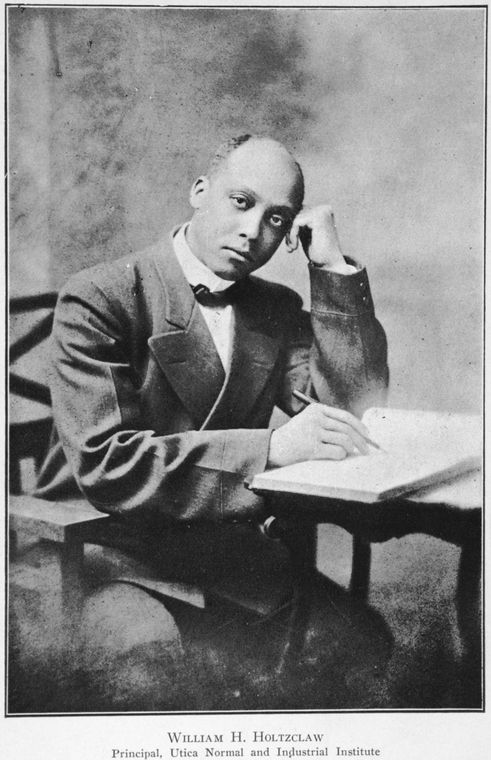
- William H. Holtzclaw from his book The Black Man's Burden
- Born: 1870; Roanoke Alabama
- Died: 1943 (aged 72–73)

William Henry Holtzclaw (1870–1943) was an educator and the founder of Utica Institute in Mississippi. Holtzclaw was a graduate of the Tuskegee Institute and desired to start his own school. He settled in Utica, Mississippi, bought land on credit, and persuaded the locals to appoint him teacher of what was then called the Utica Negro School in 1902. Holtzclaw and his students built the first and second school buildings themselves. By 1903 the school had 225 pupils and was supported by white and black members of the community. The school became incorporated by the state of Mississippi as the Utica Normal and Industrial Institute for the Training of Colored Young Men and Women and taught both academic subjects and also vocational work. Holtzclaw became principal of the school and worked on attracting funds, and received donations from Andrew Carnegie.

Holtzclaw was also a writer. He published two newspapers, the monthly Utica News and a school newspaper, Southern Notes. He published his autobiography, The Black Man’s Burden, in 1915.

The school became Utica Institute Junior College, then the Utica campus of Hinds Community College. The school's library is the William H. Holtzclaw Library. Holtzclaw's house, called the Holtzclaw Mansion was the last surviving building from the original campus. It was listed as one of the ten most endangered places in Mississippi and was demolished in 2014.

== Personal life ==
Holtzclaw was born in Randolph County, Alabama, near the town of Roanoke, to Jerry and Addie Greer Holtzclaw. He wrote directly to Booker T. Washington asking for and receiving admission to Tuskegee Institute. He was married to educator Mary Ella Patterson who he met at Tuskegee and they had three sons and two daughters.
