= Jim Jowett =

English footballer

Personal information
- Full name: Sylvester James Jowett
- Date of birth: 27 January 1926
- Place of birth: Sheffield, West Riding of Yorkshire, England
- Date of death: 1986 (aged 59–60)
- Place of death: Salisbury, Wiltshire, England
- Position: Winger

Senior career*
Years	Team	Apps	(Gls)
	Sheffield United	0	(0)
1946	York City	1	(0)
Total		1	(0)
- * Club domestic league appearances and goals

Sylvester James Jowett (27 January 1926 – 1986) was an English amateur footballer who played as a winger in the Football League for York City, and was on the books of Sheffield United without making a league appearance. He died in Salisbury, Wiltshire in 1986.
