= Bradley S. Jewitt =

Former Mayor and Councilmember for the Town of Berwyn Heights, Maryland

- In office May 2002 – 2003 and 2006 - 2008
- Preceded by: Ronald M. Shane
- Succeeded by: Patricia D. Dennison
- Constituency: Prince George's County

Personal details
- Born: October 31, 1969 (age 56) Pennsylvania
- Spouse: Cheryl Jewitt
- Children: Hunter
- Council member, Town of Berwyn Heights, 2000-2003, 2006-2008. Mayor, Town of Town of Berwyn Heights, Maryland, May 2002-2003

Bradley S. Jewitt (born October 31, 1969) is a former Mayor and Councilmember for the Town of Berwyn Heights, Maryland.

== Education and career ==
Jewitt enlisted in the Marine Corps in 1989. During the Persian Gulf War he was stationed in California and served as an infantryman in California, assigned to a combat replacement company.

Later, Jewitt earned a B.A. in political science from York College of Pennsylvania, earned a commissioned, and became a financial management officer. He was on active duty for 9 years, "much of it stationed in the Pacific theater".

Jewitt was a Major in the Marine Corps Reserve and was the civilian head of the Facilities Management Section at Marine Corps Headquarters in Arlington, Virginia. Later, he was assigned to the Legislative Affairs Office.

Jewitt was first appointed to the Berwyn Heights Town Council in February 2002, to fill the vacancy left by Tawanna P. Gaines, when she resigned, but a latter election, with 385 or 387 out of the 490 ballots cast, won him the mayoral position.

Jewitt, who is a Marine Corps Reservist, was called to active duty after serving eight months as Mayor of Berwyn Heights. He resigned from the position because he was called to activate military service as part of Operation Enduring Freedom. Jewitt said, due to the nature and duration of his orders, he felt it was in the best interest of the town to resign.

After he returned, in a 2004 bid for the U.S. House of Representatives, Jewitt lost to Rep. Steny Hoyer (D-Dist. 5) of Mechanicsville.

He served as Mayor Pro tempore from 2006 to 2008. In 2014, he was a Colonel and retired in Marine Corps Reserve in September 2021.

In 2009, Jewitt deployed to Iraq as part of Operation Iraqi Freedom and "was a team chief of a military unit that helped coordinate the sale of U.S. arms and training to Iraqi Federal Police". He "conducted over 150 missions through the Red Zone".

From 2016 to 2018, Jewitt served on the Maryland Military Monuments Commission. From 2016 to 2020, he was on the Maryland Military Installations Council.

In 2019, Jewitt was selected as a Fellow Whitehouse Leadership Development Fellow in cohort 4.

In 2018, Jewitt was selected as a national board member for the Military Officers Association of America from 2018 to 2024. From 2017 to 2020, he served on the Maryland Veteran Commission. From 2017 to 2020, he was Chair of the Prince George's Commission for Veterans.

In November 2022, Jewitt was the Deputy Chief Administrative Officer (SES level) in the Office of the Assistant Secretary for Administration at the Department of Housing and Urban Development. He retired from HUD in December 2025. In the past, he was the Associate Director and Chief of the Facilities Management Division, Management Operations Directorate for the NASA Goddard Space Flight Center. Jewitt is a Joint Qualified Officer and a graduate of the full-length, resident Air War College where he received a Master's of Strategic Studies degree. He also has a Bachelor of Arts degree in Political Science from York College of Pennsylvania and a Master's of Science in Management from Troy University.

=== Awards and achievements ===
- Bronze Star medal
- Legion of Merit Medal in September 2021

== Personal life ==
Jewitt is from Pennsylvania. He graduated from Strath Haven High School in 1988. He has a son, Hunter, by his first marriage. Since 2004, he is married to Cheryl Jewitt, who is also a former mayor of Berwyn Heights.
