= Orlando Jewitt =

British engraver (1799–1869)

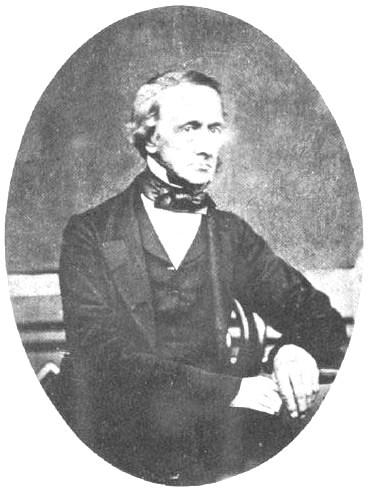
- Orlando Jewitt
- Born: Thomas Orlando Sheldon Jewitt; 1799; Buxton, Derbyshire
- Died: 30 May 1869 (aged 70); Clifton Villas (now Cliff Villas), London
- Known for: Wood-engraver

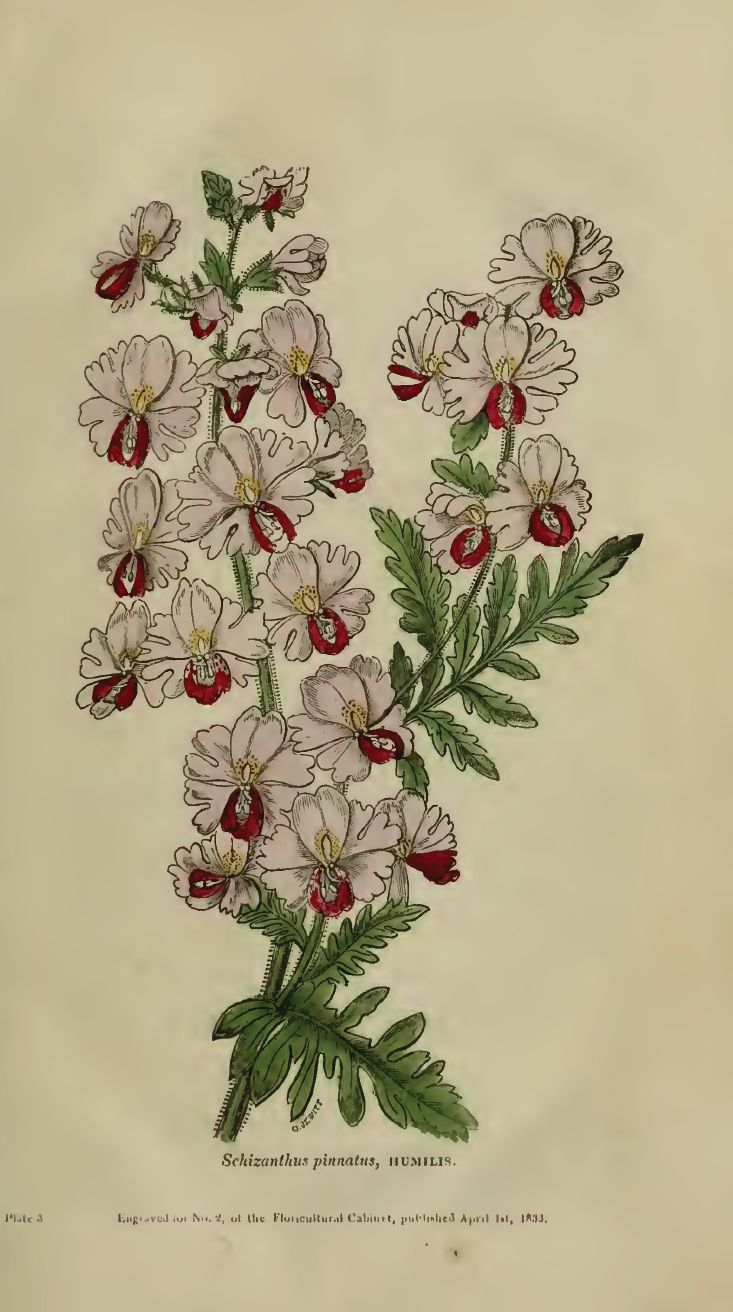
Schizanthus pinnatus from Joseph Harrison's "The Floricultural Cabinet and Florist's Magazine"

Thomas Orlando Sheldon Jewitt (1799 – 30 May 1869) was a British architectural wood-engraver.

== Biography ==
Thomas Orlando Sheldon Jewitt was born in Buxton, Derbyshire, the son of Arthur Jewitt and brother of Llewellyn Jewitt.

Before the introduction of photographic processes in the late nineteenth century, wood-engraving was the standard method of book illustration. Jewitt's illustrations were widely used between 1820 and 1870. Many of his prints are still reproduced in modern works and are frequently to be found in reference works covering architecture, archaeology, typography and natural history. He produced numerous prints used for seals and bookplates.

At time of the 1841 census, Jewitt was living at Church House, St Andrew's Road, Headington; besides him, his wife Phoebe and three children, the census returns also record his brother, George Jewitt, a letter-press printer, and his apprentice, Edward Bower, at the same address. He was considered as one of the ten men suitable to serve as parish constable of Headington in 1844 and 1845. In 1855 Jewitt was Churchwarden of St Andrew's Church, but later that year made a sudden decision to relocate to London.

Jewitt died on Sunday 30 May 1869 in Camden Square, London, and was buried in Paddington Old Cemetery. His wife died on 11 March 1883.

== Gallery ==
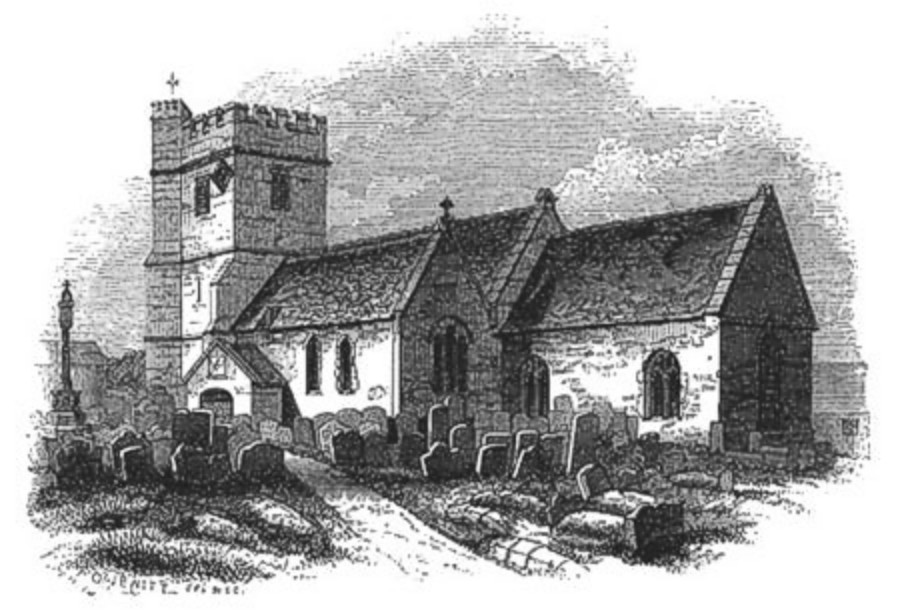
St Andrew's Church, Headington (1842)

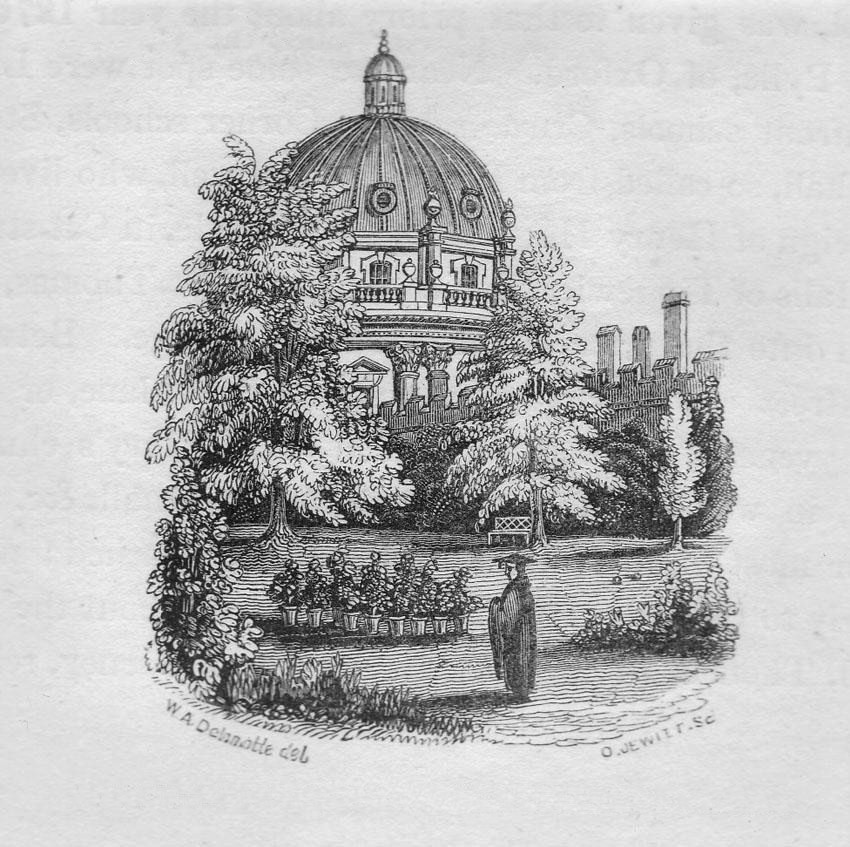
The Library from Exeter College Garden, Oxford (1837)

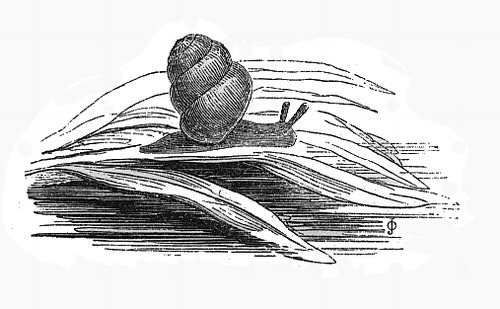
Engraving of Vertigo substriata from 1863 The land and freshwater mollusks indigenous to, or naturalized in, the British Isles

== Books illustrated ==
- J. H. Parker. A Guide to the Architectural Antiquities in the Neighbourhood of Oxford (F. & J. Rivington, 1842)
- J. H. Parker. Glossary of Architecture (Parker, archaeologist and publisher of Oxford)
- A Manual of British Archaeology (Charles Boutell, London, Lovell 1858)
- Matthew Holbeche Bloxam. Principles of Gothic Architecture
- 1863 Lovell Reeve (1814–1865), (with illustrations by George Brettingham Sowerby II and Orlando Jewitt). The land and freshwater mollusks indigenous to, or naturalized in, the British Isles. Reeve & Co., London.
- Churches of Northamptonshire
- Domestic Architecture
- Guidebooks to the English Cathedrals
- Memorials of Westminster Abbey (Scott)
- Books on Venice and Spain (Street )

== Bibliography ==
- Broomhead, Frank. The Book Illustrations of Orlando Jewitt. Pinner, Middlesex: Private Libraries Association, 1995 ISBN 0-900002-36-0
- Orlando Jewitt:Wood Engraver (Harry Carter, Oxford University Press 1962)
