= Jowell =

Jowell is a surname. Notable people with the surname include:

- Sir Jeffrey Jowell (living), British barrister
- Roger Jowell (1942–2011), British statistician and academic
- Tessa Jowell (1947–2018), British politician

== See also ==
- Jowell & Randy, Puerto Rican reggaeton musicians
- Powell (surname)
