= Arthur Jewitt =

English topographer

Arthur Jewitt (1772–1852) was an English topographer.

== Life ==
Jewitt was the eldest son of Arthur and Mary Jewitt. His mother was the daughter of Jonathan Priestley of Dronfield and she gave birth to Arthur in Sheffield on 7 March 1772. At the age of fourteen he was apprenticed to his father, a cutler. At the end of his apprenticeship on his twenty-first birthday, 7 March 1793, he married Martha Sheldon of Crooke's Moor, Sheffield.

Jewitt had read largely from youth, and now opened a private school. In 1794 he became master of a school at Chesterfield, and after several removals and changes was master of the Kimberworth school from 1814 to 1818, when he retired from educational work and removed to Duffield near Derby. There he remained until 1838, when he joined some of his family at Headington, near Oxford. He died at Headington on his birthday, 7 March 1852. His wife died at Duffield in November 1835. Two of his seven sons were Llewellyn Jewitt (1816–1886) and Orlando Jewitt (1799–1869).

== Works ==
Jewitt was known by his topographical works. The History of Lincolnshire appeared in 1810, and The History of Buxton in 1811. In July 1817 he commenced The Northern Star, or Yorkshire Magazine, a monthly register of arts, biography, statistics, manufactures, &c., which ran to three volumes, 1817–18. On 1 January 1818 he brought out the first number of The Sylph, or Lady's Magazine for Yorkshire, Derbyshire, and the adjoining Counties. The Lincoln and Lincolnshire Cabinet and Annual Intelligencer appeared at Lincoln during 1827–9. His Matlock Companion, 1835, and Derbyshire Gems were very popular. His Handbook of Practical Perspective, 1840, and his Handbook of Geometry, 1842, were adopted by the committee of council on education.

He contributed mathematical papers to the British Diary and to the Lady's and the Gentleman's diaries, and was a writer for the Penny Magazine, and for Britton and Brayley's Graphic and Historical Illustrator.

He also wrote Peak Rhapsody a moving tribute to the land where the purple heather the thyme & bilberry grow together.
