= Jewett Campbell =

American painter, teacher (1912–1999)

- Born: Benjamin Jewitt Campbell; August 10, 1912; Hoboken, New Jersey, U.S.
- Died: July 25, 1999 (aged 86); Richmond, Virginia, U.S.
- Burial place: Hollywood Cemetery, Richmond, Virginia, U.S.
- Education: Art Students League of New York, Cooper Union
- Occupations: Painter, educator
- Spouse: Jeanne Begien (1944–1999; his death)
- Children: 1
- Awards: Virginia Governor's Award (1985)

Jewett Campbell (né Benjamin Jewitt Campbell; 1912–1999) was an American painter, and teacher, from Richmond, Virginia. He taught painting and printmaking for 40 years at the Virginia Commonwealth University (VCU, formerly known as Richmond Professional Institute).

== Biography ==
Benjamin Jewitt Campbell was born on August 10, 1912, in Hoboken, New Jersey. He attended Cooper Union in New York City for night classes; and the Art Students League of New York, where he studied under John Steuart Curry, Kenneth Hayes Miller, Henry Varnum Poor, Hans Hofmann, and Guy Pène du Bois.

Campbell moved to Richmond, Virginia in 1939. He served in the United States Navy during World War II.

Campbell taught at the Virginia Commonwealth University School of the Arts (VCU School of the Arts, formerly known as Richmond Professional Institute) for 40 years, as well as at the University of Richmond. His former students include Judith Godwin. Campbell retired from VCU in 1984, and the following year he held a retrospective exhibition at the Anderson Gallery at VCU.

In 1985, Campbell was awarded the Virginia Governor's Award by Gov. Charles Robb.

His work is in museum collections, including at the Museum of Modern Art (MoMA), and the Virginia Museum of Fine Arts.
