= Llewellynn Jewitt =

British illustrator and antiquarian (1816–1886)

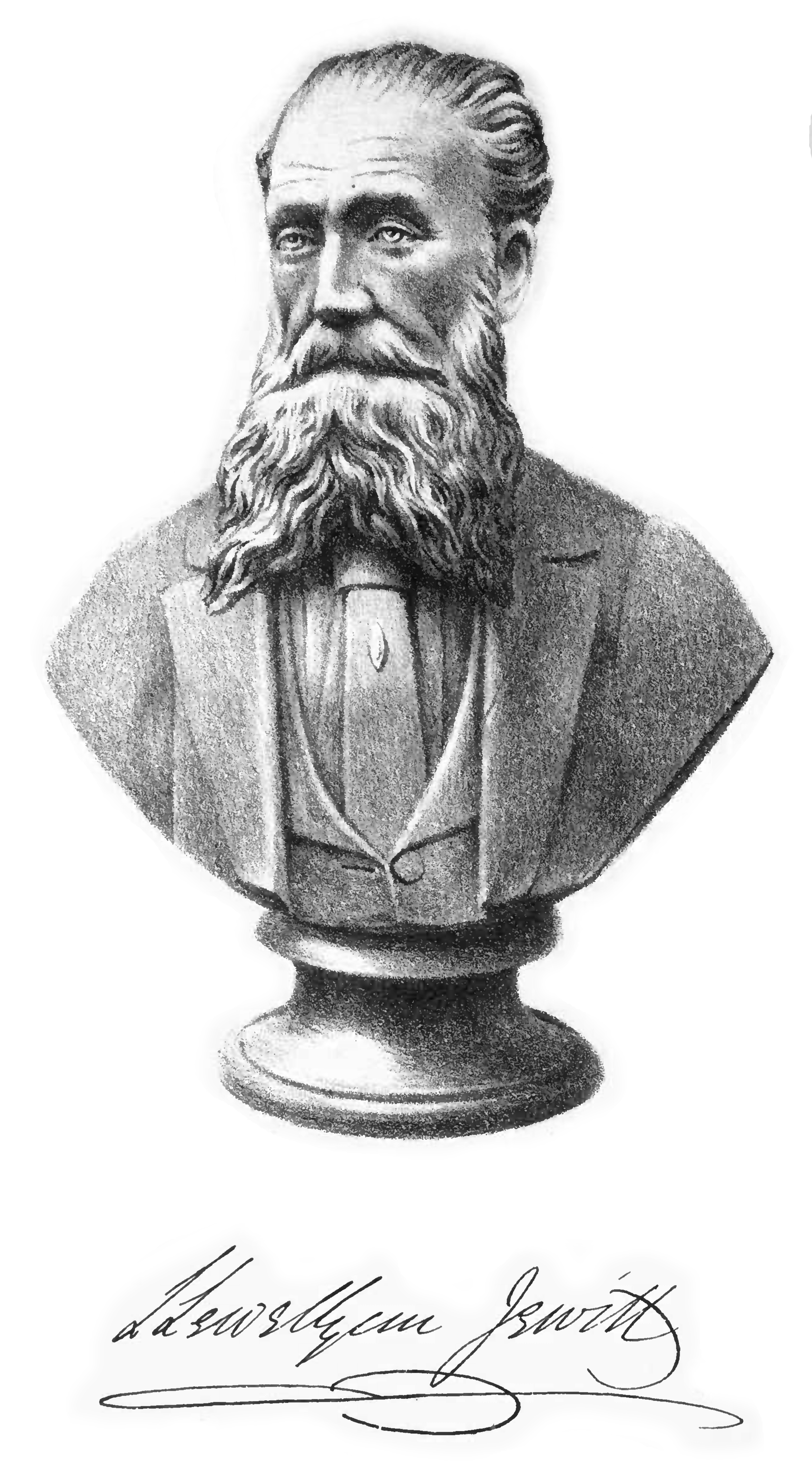
- Engraving of a bust of Llewellynn Jewitt. The engraving was made by Jewitt himself and represents a bust made by William Henry Goss.
- Born: 24 November 1816 near Rotherham, England
- Died: 5 June 1886 (aged 69); Duffield, Derbyshire, England
- Occupation: Engraver
- Parent: Arthur and Martha Jewitt

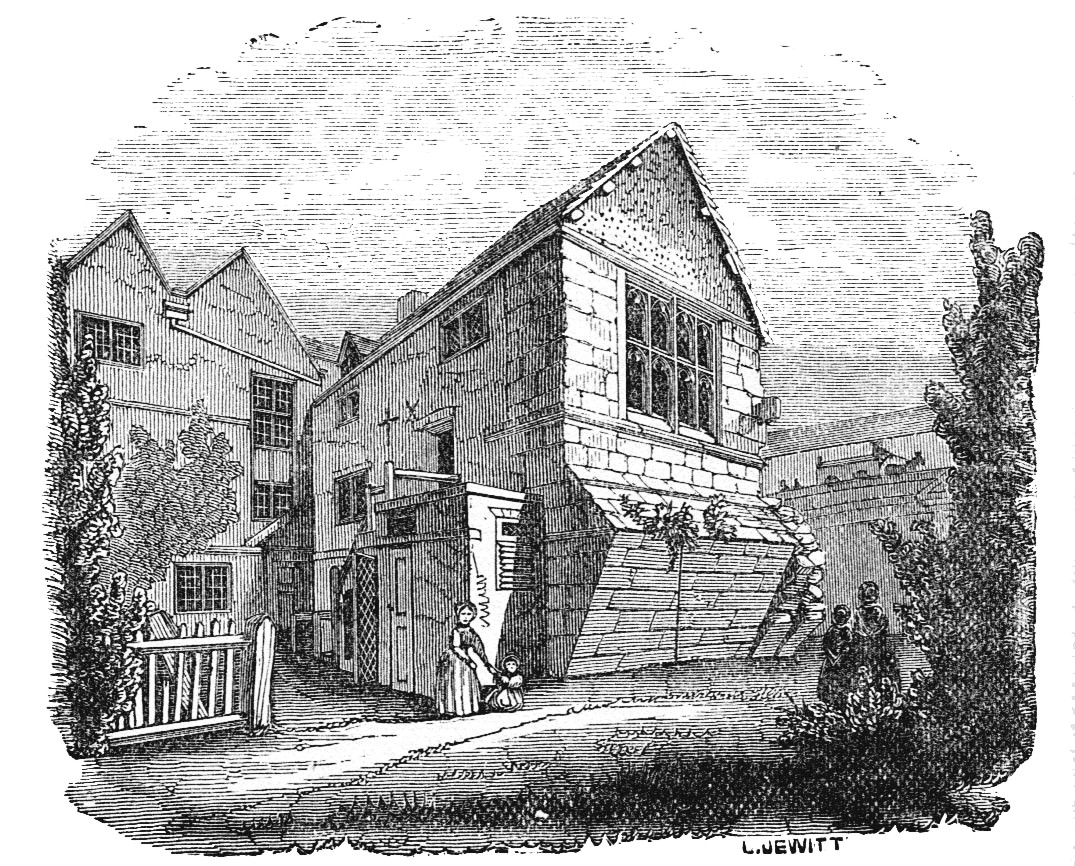
St Mary's Bridge Chapel, Derby

Llewellynn Frederick William Jewitt (or Llewellyn; 24 November 1816 – 5 June 1886) was a British illustrator, engraver, natural scientist and author of The Ceramic Art of Great Britain (1878). His output was prodigious and covered a large range of interests.

== Biography ==
Jewitt was born at Kimberworth, Rotherham, the seventeenth and final child of artist, author and schoolmaster Arthur Jewitt and his wife Martha. His education, largely from his father, who was master at Kimberworth Endowed School, started in Duffield, Derbyshire where his family moved in 1818.

On Christmas Day of 1838 he married Elizabeth Sage, daughter of Isaac Sage of Derby, hurriedly returning to London the same day so as not to fall behind in his work. From 1839 to 1845 he was employed by the engraver Frederick William Fairholt, to illustrate the works of Charles Knight, and contribute to the Pictorial Times, the Saturday Magazine, the Illustrated London News and Punch. He worked at Buckingham Palace in 1845, sketching the palace rooms in preparation for a work on London Interiors.

Between 1849 and 1853 Jewitt was the chief librarian of Plymouth Public Library and a member of The Plymouth Institution (now The Plymouth Athenaeum).

In September 1853 he returned to Derbyshire to found and edit the Derby Telegraph, the first cheap paper in the county, continuing as its editor to 1868. In 1857, Jewitt became secretary of the Derby Town and County Museum and Natural History Society and its premises were opened to the general public on Saturday mornings. In 1860 Jewitt founded his own heavily illustrated and lavishly produced antiquarian journal The Reliquary, of which he was editor until his death in 1886 when it was continued by others. Under his editorship the journal's focus was heavily on Derbyshire and the Peak, reflecting Jewitt's then home location at Winster Hall, Derbyshire.

While at Winster Hall he learned that the local water supply to the nearby villages was contaminated with lead ore in the local limestone, and he led a highly successful local project to supply free water via a three-mile pipe fed by clean springs.

He died at The Hollies, Duffield in 1886. The potter William Henry Goss wrote a memoir of him entitled The Life and Death of Llewellynn Jewitt F.S.A., with Fragmentary Memoirs of his Famous Literary and Artistic Friends, especially of Samuel Carter Hall (1889).

Jewitt belonged to the British Archaeological Association and helped found the Derbyshire Archaeological Society in 1878. He was a Fellow of the Society of Antiquaries, wrote numerous articles on English antiquities and topography, and edited the tourist handbook Black's Guide to Derbyshire (1857) which was reprinted many times.

== Books ==
- Black's Tourist's Guide to Derbyshire (editor; 1857)
- The Wedgwoods (1865)
- The Ballads and Songs of Derbyshire (1867)
- The Life of William Hutton (1869)
- Grave-mounds and Their Contents (1870)
- Mountain, River, Lake, and Landscape Scenery of Great Britain (1870/78) in 3 vols.
- Haddon Hall. An Illustrated Guide, with S. C. Hall (1871)
- Domesday Book of Derbyshire (editor; 1871)
- A History of Plymouth (1873)
- Half-Hours Among Some English Antiquities (1877)
- The Stately Homes of England, with S. C. Hall (1877) in 2 vols.
- The Ceramic Art of Great Britain (1878) in 2 vols. (revised 1972). Original at Project Gutenberg.
- English Coins and Tokens, with a Chapter on Greek and Roman Coins (1879) at Project Gutenberg.
- The Life and Works of Jacob Thompson (1882)
