= John G. Utterback =

American politician (1872–1955)

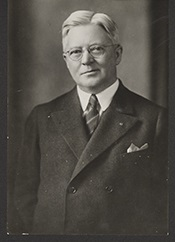
- Utterback circa 1935. Photo collections of the U.S. House of Representatives.

Member of the U.S. House of Representatives from Maine's 3rd district
- In office March 4, 1933 – January 3, 1935
- Preceded by: John E. Nelson
- Succeeded by: Owen Brewster

Mayor of Bangor, Maine
- In office 1914–1915
- Preceded by: Flavius O. Beal
- Succeeded by: Frank Robinson

Personal details
- Born: John Gregg Utterback; July 12, 1872 Franklin, Indiana, U.S.
- Died: July 11, 1955 (aged 83) Bangor, Maine, U.S.
- Party: Democratic
- Profession: Carriage dealer Automobile dealer

John Gregg Utterback (July 12, 1872 – July 11, 1955) was an American businessman and U.S. Representative from Maine, and a cousin of Congressman Hubert Utterback.

== Early life ==
Utterback was born and educated in Franklin, Indiana. In 1889, he began working in a local carriage factory, where he remained until 1892.

From 1892 to 1905, Utterback was a traveling salesman, and represented a variety of products. While pursuing his sales career, he lived in Jackson, Michigan, Rochester, New York, and Winchester, Massachusetts.

== Later career ==
In 1905, Utterback settled in Bangor, Maine where he operated a carriage dealership, which evolved into a successful automobile dealership. Utterback sold the King automobile, and later Atlas trucks and the trucks of the Commerce Motor Car Company. He also became active in politics as a Democrat, and served on the city council from 1912 to 1913, as an alderman from 1913 to 1914.. He was mayor of Bangor from 1914 to 1915. In 1930, Utterback was chairman of the Maine Motor Vehicle Conference Committee, and he was a delegate to the 1932 Democratic National Convention.

== Congressman ==
Utterback was elected as a Democrat to the Seventy-third United States Congress (March 4, 1933 – January 3, 1935), defeating Republican Owen Brewster by 324 votes. Brewster contested the result, claiming fraud in the French-Canadian districts of Aroostook County. Utterback prevailed, aided by a lack of sympathy for Brewster among the Republican 'old guard' who heard his challenge. Outgoing Republican Governor William Tudor Gardiner declared "preposterous" Brewster's idea that Gardiner personally investigate the allegations.

Fittingly for a candidate from the "wet" Bangor, Utterback made his first congressional speech in support of the repeal of Prohibition around which he had built his campaign. Bangor's saloons had been a major target of the Maine's prohibition law (in force for 75 years), the oldest in the nation. The Maine law was widely supported in rural districts but not in the cities. Brewster was from the town of Dexter, and his law office was in Bangor, but he continued to favor prohibition even though by the 1930s, the national Republican Party had begun to favor repeal.

Brewster opposed Utterback in the 1934 election and defeated Utterback. One issue that went against Utterback was Congress' failure to support a planned tidal power project in Passamaquoddy Bay, which would have been a major job creator in Utterback's district.

== Later career ==
In 1935, Utterback was appointed United States Marshal for the District of Maine, and he served until resigning in 1944. He continued to remain active in the automobile business as president of the Utterback Corporation truck and car dealerships.

== Death and burial ==
He died in Bangor, Maine, July 11, 1955, and was interred in Mount Hope Cemetery.

== See also ==
- List of mayors of Bangor, Maine

U.S. House of Representatives
Preceded by John E. Nelson	Member of the U.S. House of Representatives from Maine's 3rd congressional district March 4, 1933 – January 3, 1935	Succeeded by Owen Brewster
