= 1930 Maine gubernatorial election =

- September 8, 1930
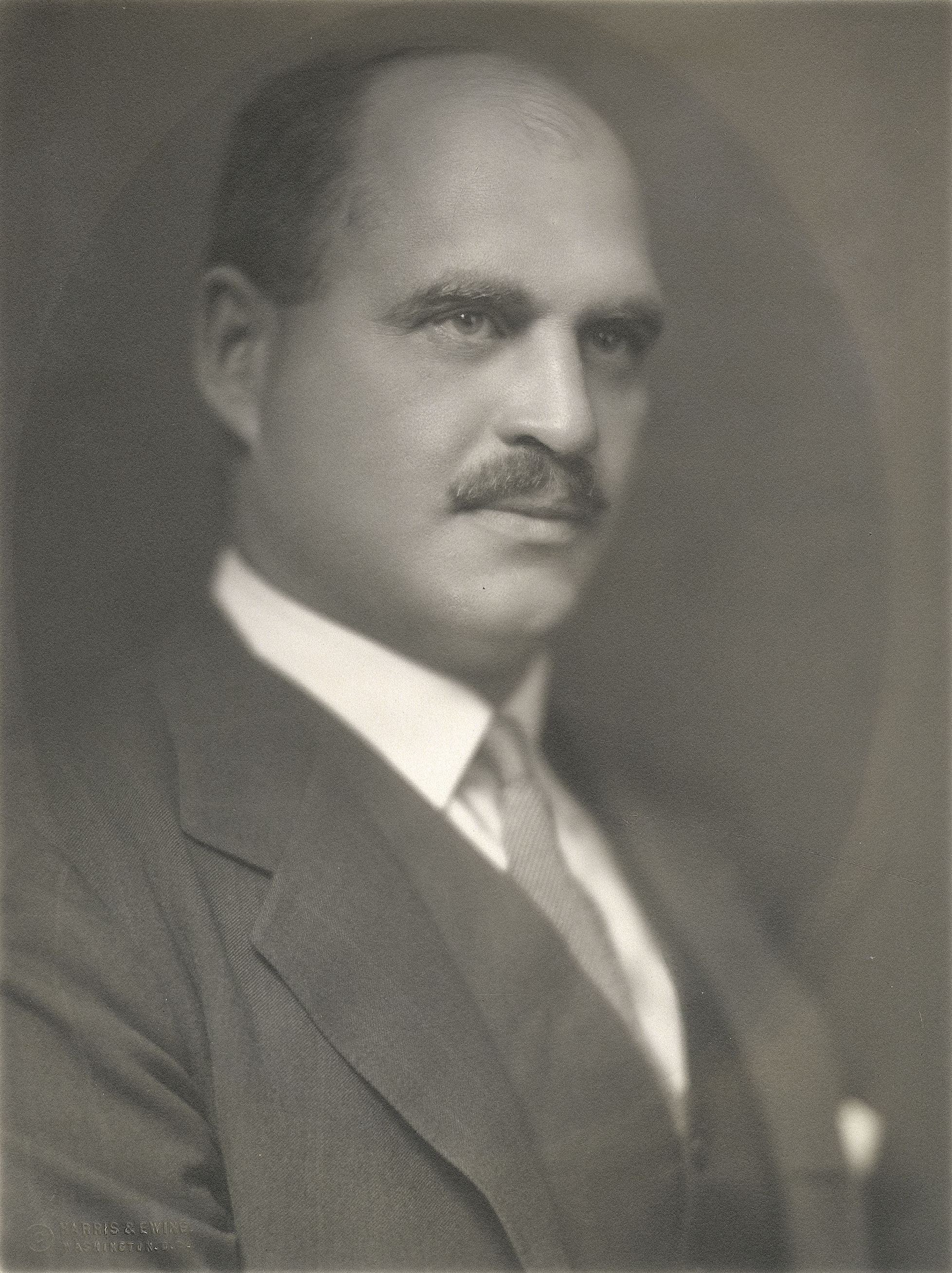

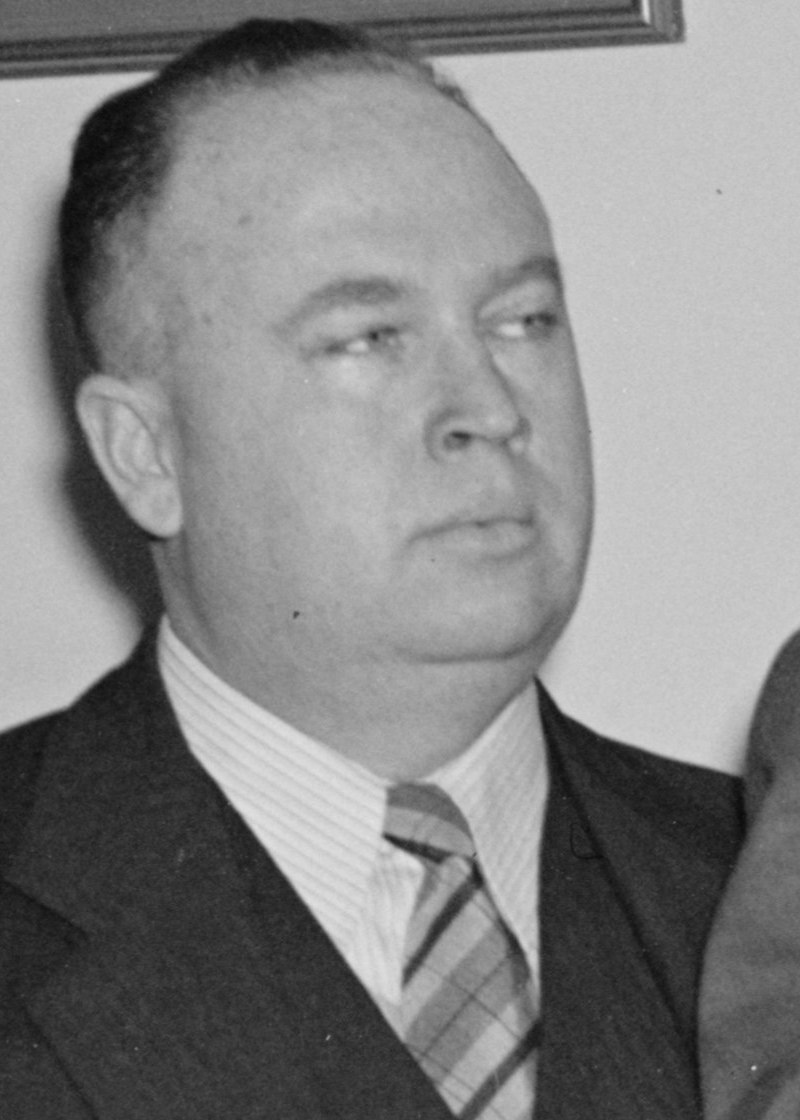
Nominee	William Tudor Gardiner	Edward C. Moran Jr.
Party	Republican	Democratic
Popular vote	82,310	67,172
Percentage	55.06%	44.94%
- County results Gardiner: 50–60% 60–70% 70–80% Moran: 50–60%
Governor before election
William Tudor Gardiner
Republican
Elected Governor
William Tudor Gardiner
Republican

The 1930 Maine gubernatorial election took place on September 8, 1930.

In a rematch of the 1928 gubernatorial election, incumbent Republican Governor William Tudor Gardiner defeated Democratic candidate Edward C. Moran Jr.

== Results ==
1930 Maine gubernatorial election
Party	Candidate	Votes	%	±%
Republican	William Tudor Gardiner (incumbent)	82,310	55.06%	
Democratic	Edward C. Moran Jr.	67,172	44.94%	
Majority		15,138	10.12%	
Turnout		149,482	100.00%	
Republican hold		Swing		
