= NGC 2617 =

Galaxy in the constellation Hydra

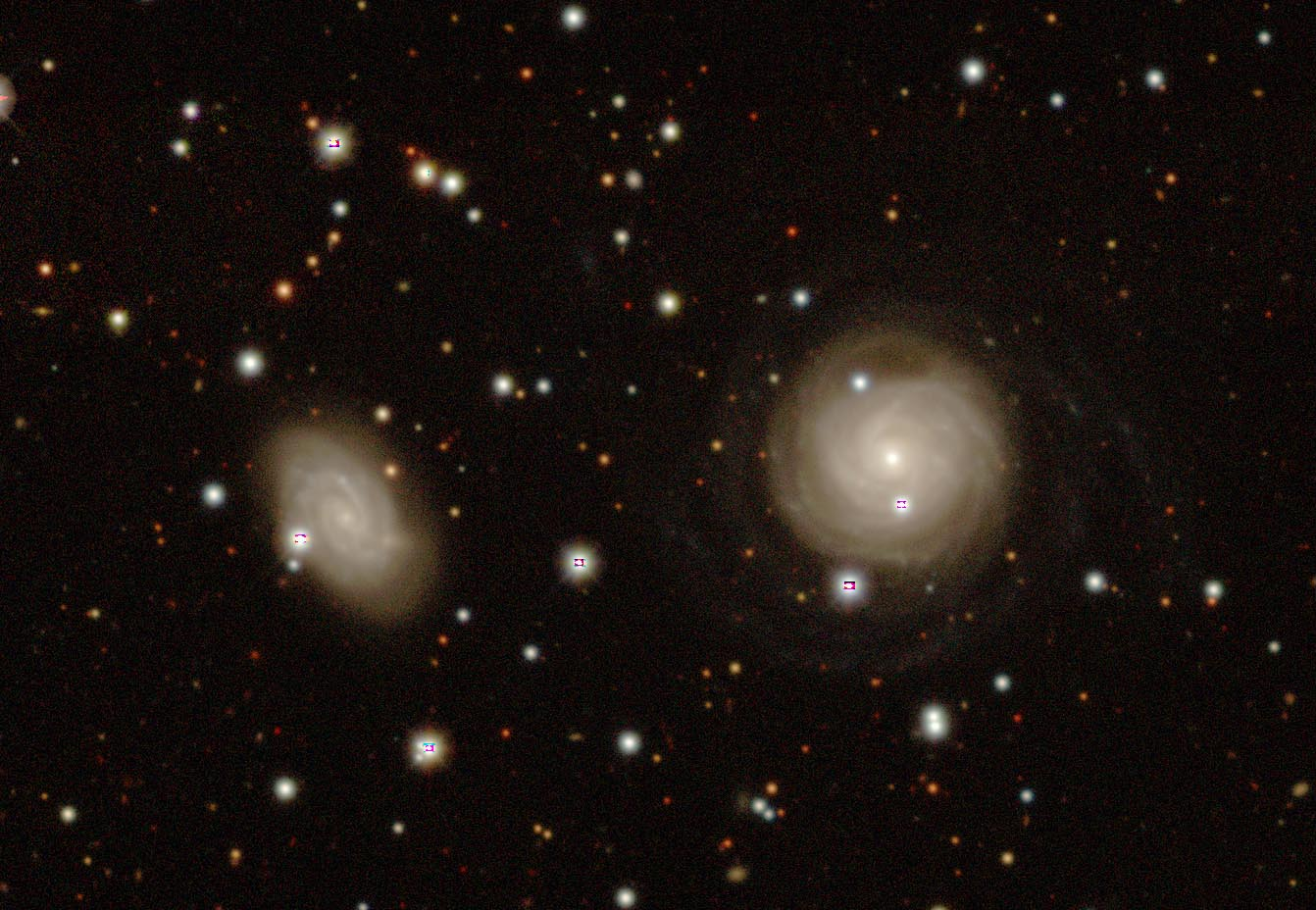
- legacy surveys image of NGC 2617 (right) and MCG-01-22-027

Observation data (J2000 epoch)
- Constellation: Hydra
- Right ascension: 08^{h} 35^{m} 38.798^{s}
- Declination: −04° 05′ 17.90″
- Heliocentric radial velocity: 4,287 km/s
- Distance: 201.8 Mly (61.86 Mpc)h^{−1}_{0.73}
- Apparent magnitude (V): 12.66±0.20
- Apparent magnitude (B): 14.10±0.30

Characteristics
- Type: Sc
- Apparent size (V): 0.693′ × 0.652′ (infrared)

Other designations
- IRAS F08331-0354, 2MASX J08353877-0405172, NGC 2617, MCG −01–22–026

NGC 2617 is a Seyfert galaxy in the equatorial constellation of Hydra. It was discovered on February 12, 1885, by French astronomer Édouard Stephan. In 1888, Danish astronomer J. L. E. Dreyer described it as "extremely faint, very small, 2 very faint stars involved". It is located at an estimated distance of 202 million light years. In the infrared, the galaxy has an angular size of 0.693 by 0.652 arcminutes.

This is an almost face-on spiral galaxy with a morphological classification of Sc, indicating a spiral galaxy (S) with loosely wound spiral arms (c). In 1992, NGC 2617 was shown to be an extragalactic source of X-ray emission, and in 1996 it was identified as a Seyfert 1.8 galaxy by E. C. Moran and associates. A radio counterpart was found in 1998.

During April 2013, a dramatic outburst was discovered at the core of NGC 2617, and the spectral type was found to have changed to a Seyfert 1. An increase in X-ray emission was observed, followed by an increase in ultraviolet and then infrared luminosity. This event can be modeled by X-ray radiation heating the accretion disk orbiting a supermassive black hole (SMBH) at the center of the galaxy. This was followed by emission at longer wavelengths from the heated disk. An increase in luminosity between 2010 and 2012 may have cleared away dust in the inner part of the disk prior to the outburst, allowing a clearer view and changing the Seyfert type of the galaxy. The SMBH has an estimated mass of 30.9+11.8
−8.5 million M_{☉}.

Additional outbursts were observed from 2016 to 2018, in between deep minima.
