= John E. Nelson (Maine politician) =

American politician (1874–1955)

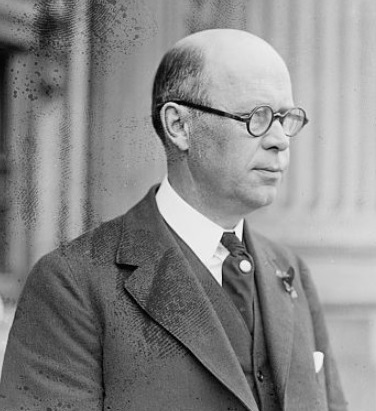

Member of the U.S. House of Representatives from Maine's 3rd district
- In office March 20, 1922 – March 3, 1933
- Preceded by: John A. Peters
- Succeeded by: John G. Utterback

Personal details
- Born: John Edward Nelson; July 12, 1874 China, Maine, U.S.
- Died: April 11, 1955 (aged 80) Augusta, Maine, U.S.
- Resting place: Pine Grove Cemetery, Waterville, Maine, U.S.
- Party: Republican
- Education: University of Maine at Orono

John Edward Nelson (July 12, 1874 – April 11, 1955) was a United States representative from Maine. He was born in China, Kennebec County, Maine on July 12, 1874.

He attended the common and high schools of Waterville, Maine. He graduated from Friends School, Providence, Rhode Island in 1894, from Colby College in 1898, and from the law department of the University of Maine at Orono in 1904.

He was admitted to the bar in 1904 and commenced practice in Waterville. He then moved to Augusta in 1913 and continued the practice of his chosen profession.

He was elected as a Republican to the Sixty-seventh Congress, by special election, to fill the vacancy caused by the resignation of United States Representative John A. Peters. He was reelected to the five succeeding Congresses (March 20, 1922 – March 3, 1933), but was an unsuccessful candidate for reelection in 1932 to the Seventy-third Congress.

He was a trustee of Colby College 1926-1931, and also served as trustee of Monmouth (Maine) Academy. He practiced law until his retirement in 1946, and died on April 11, 1955, in Augusta, Maine. He was interred in Pine Grove Cemetery in Waterville.

== Dissenter on Anti-Communist Fish Committee ==
In 1930 Nelson served on a House Committee convened by Rep. Hamilton Fish III of New York to investigate communist activity in the United States. When the committee's report was issued in early 1931, it called for the outlawing of the Communist Party in the United States, denying citizenship to naturalized communists, and other measures to guard against what it saw as a substantial domestic political threat. Nelson refused to sign it, and issued his own minority report, finding that "communism is making no menacing headway in America" and recommending that no new legislation need be enacted. He decried the "hysteria" over Communism, declaring, "Our best defense against the red shirt of the Communist and the black shirt of the Fascist is the blue shirt of the American workingman." The New York World congratulated Nelson as the "one member of the committee (who) was able to keep his feet on the ground".

== 1932 election ==
Nelson was defeated in the 1932 election, which, coming in the early years of the Great Depression, was a statewide landslide for Democrats. He was hurt as well by a recent census-based re-districting that for the first time placed Democratic-leaning urban centers in Maine's Second Congressional District. He was further hurt by the presence in the race of an "Independent Republican", Frederick E. Bonney, whom he accused of being a 'spoiler' for his Democratic rival, Edward C. Moran. Bonney accused Nelson of nepotism for putting some of his children on the congressional payroll as aides.

U.S. House of Representatives
Preceded by John A. Peters	Member of the U.S. House of Representatives from Maine's 3rd congressional district March 20, 1922 – March 3, 1933	Succeeded by John G. Utterback
