= John W. Priest =

American architect (1825–1859)

John Weller Priest
- Born: October 6, 1825; New York City
- Died: July 24, 1859 (aged 33); Newburgh, New York
- Occupation: Architect

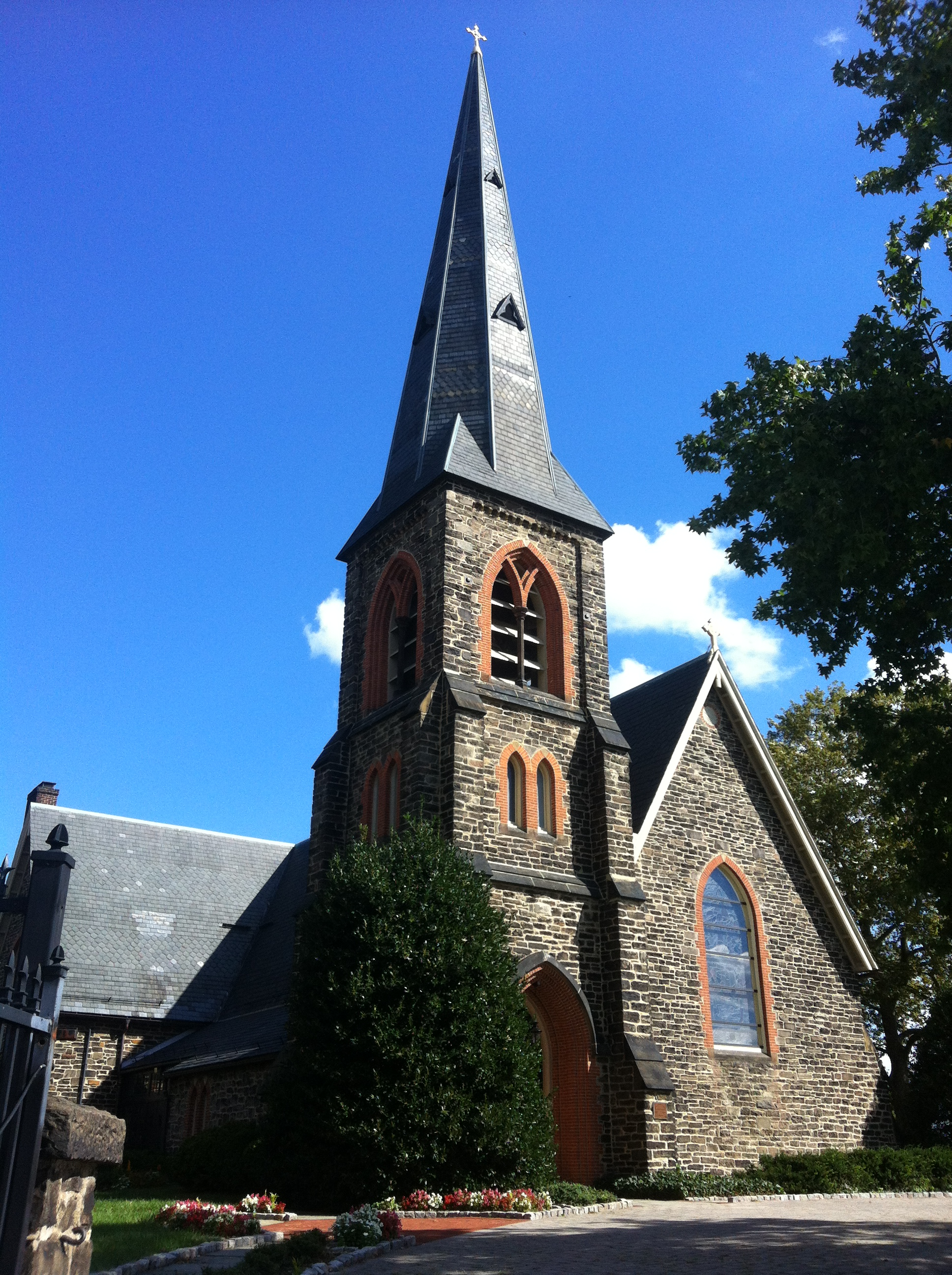
St. John's Episcopal Church in Waverly, Baltimore, designed by Priest and completed in 1860.

John W. Priest (1825–1859) was an American architect from New York and founding member of the American Institute of Architects.

== Life and career ==
John Weller Priest was born October 6, 1825, in New York City. He was educated at Washington College, now Trinity College, in Hartford, Connecticut, graduating in 1845. His architectural training is unknown, though he had some association with Andrew Jackson Downing. By at least by the late 1840s Priest was practicing architecture from his home in Balmville, near Newburgh, though he also kept a business office in New York City. In 1852 Priest was included on a short list of architects approved by the New York Ecclesiological Society, an organization based on the Ecclesiological Society of London. Priest had been previously associated with the Society, and wrote a series of influential articles on architecture in its journal in 1849 and 1850. Priest practiced architecture in Balmville until his death in 1859. Henry M. Congdon (1834-1922) was a student of Priest from 1854, and succeeded to the practice after his death. Also associated with Priest was Charles T. Rathbun (1828-1908), later a noted architect in Pittsfield, Massachusetts.

In 1857, Priest was one of the founding members of the American Institute of Architects.

== Personal life ==
Priest was consistently in poor health, necessitating his residence and practice away from New York City. He died July 24, 1859, at the age of 33.

== Legacy ==
Priest was one of only five architects approved by the New-York Ecclesiological Society. His work is limited because of his early death in 1859, not because he was an unimportant architect. He mentored architect Henry M. Congdon, who had an extensive and well-documented career in church architecture after Priest's death. The churches designed by Priest exhibit the high standards with careful proportions and detail espoused by the Ecclesiological Society. Additionally, several of his surviving works have been listed on the United States National Register of Historic Places.

== Architectural works ==
- St. Michael's Episcopal Church (former), Academy Ln, Reisterstown, Maryland (1853, NRHP 1979)
- St. Michael's Episcopal Church, 225 W 99th St, New York City (1854, demolished 1890)
- St. Stephen's Episcopal Church, 119 Main St, Millburn, New Jersey (1855)
- St. Stephen's Episcopal Church, 200 N James St, Goldsboro, North Carolina (1855–57)
- Completion of St. Luke's Episcopal Church, (Note: Begun in 1851 to designs by Niernsee & Neilson, but construction stopped in 1853. Priest threw out the original design and completed the building to his own.) 217 N Carey St, Baltimore, Maryland (1857–59, NRHP 1973)
- "Eagle's Nest" for Thomas Allen, East St, Pittsfield, Massachusetts (1858, demolished)
- St. John's Episcopal Church, (Note: Replaced a building by Robert Cary Long Jr., built in 1849 and destroyed by fire in 1858.) Waverly, Baltimore, Maryland (1858–60, NRHP 1974)
- Alterations to St. Thomas' Episcopal Church, 14300 St Thomas Church Rd, Upper Marlboro, Maryland (1858–59, NRHP 2000)
- St. John's Episcopal Church, 66 Clinton St, Cornwall, New York (1859)

His obituary indicates he designed churches in Alabama, Maryland, New Jersey, New York and North Carolina, without naming them. It also indicates he was a prolific designer of houses, but of these only Eagle's Nest is known.

== Gallery of architectural works ==
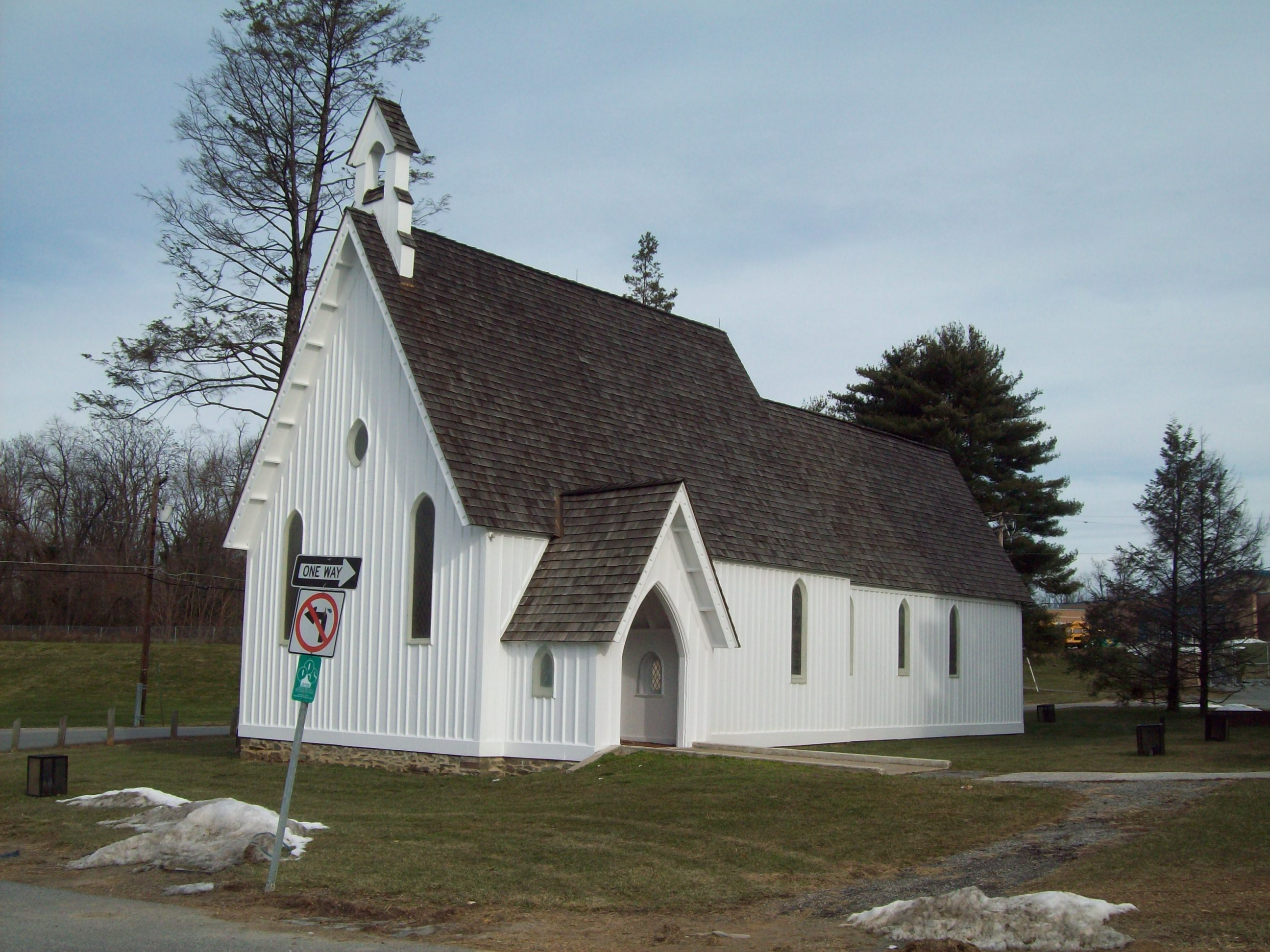
St. Michael's Episcopal Church, Reisterstown, Maryland, 1853.

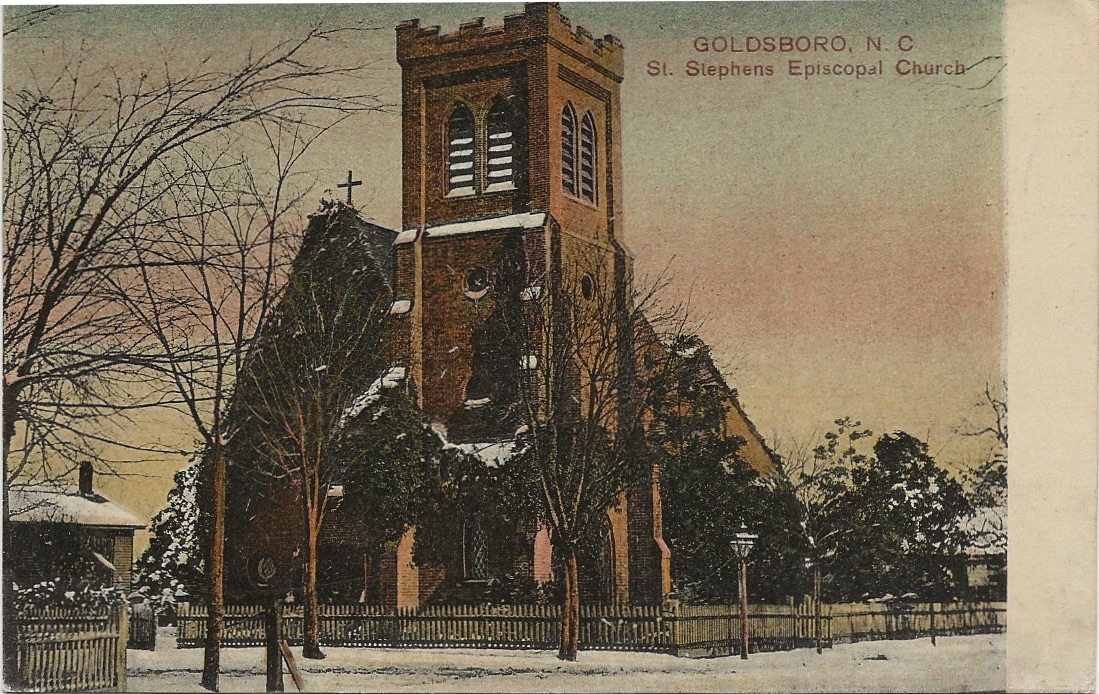
St. Stephen's Episcopal Church, Goldsboro, North Carolina, 1855-57.

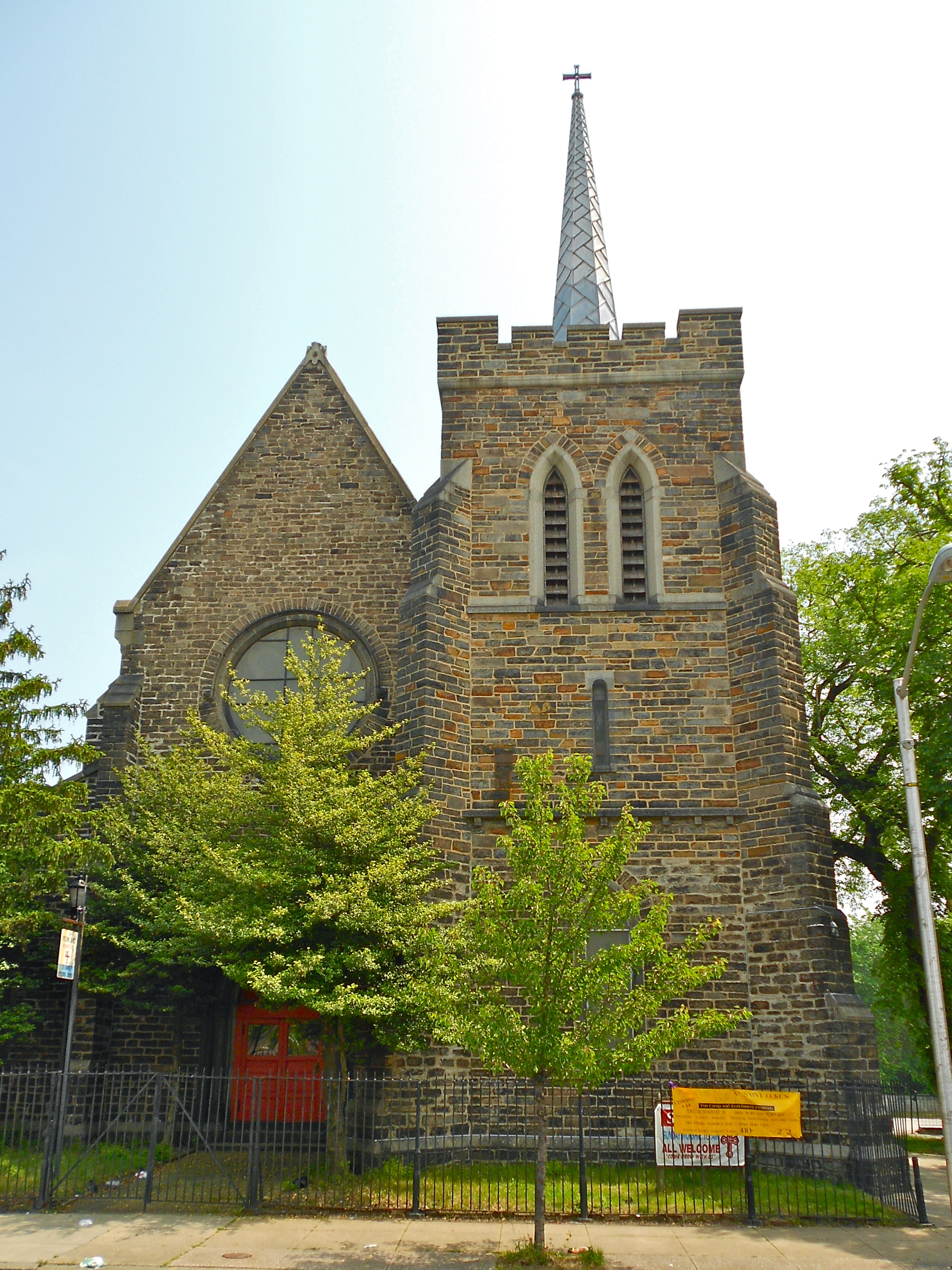
St. Luke's Episcopal Church, Baltimore, Maryland, 1857-59.
