= Robert Hallowell Gardiner III =

Robert Hallowell Gardiner III (September 9, 1855 – June 15, 1924) was an Episcopal layman and ecumenist, head of the Brotherhood of St. Andrew and one of the founders of the World Council of Churches. A prominent lawyer in Maine and Boston until his retirement for health reasons, he was the great-grandson of Dr. Silvester Gardiner, the founder of Gardiner, Maine, and a trustee for the Gardiner Lyceum school and the Roxbury Latin School.

== Early and family life ==
Robert Hallowell Gardiner III was born in a primitive adobe house in Fort Tejon, California, the son of a military officer, Captain John William Tudor Gardiner and his wife Anne Elizabeth Hays Gardiner. His mother was the daughter of a prominent Cumberland County, Pennsylvania businessman, and this was her second marriage, since her first husband (also a military officer) had fallen ill and died at Fort Leavenworth, Kansas in 1843, and she had also previously lost a baby. Although Elizabeth Hays' family was nominally Presbyterian, she married Tudor Gardiner in 1854 at a historic Episcopal church in near Washington, D.C (St. Thomas Parish).

Capt. Gardiner was then assigned to guard the Grapevine Pass through the Tehachapi Mountains, which gold prospectors crossed on their way to Placerita Canyon near Los Angeles, California. Numerous Native Americans lived in the area: the Chumash at Santa Barbara, as well as Shoshone, Kitanemuks and Yokuts. Commanding officer Col. Edward F. Beale wanted to protect these indigenous peoples as well as displaced Amerindians from a developing slave trade in Native American children. The elder Gardiners also worried that John C. Fremont had recently reversed over a century of colonial paternalism, with negative consequences toward longtime inhabitants of Spanish or Mexican descent.

In 1859, the young family (which by then included Eleanor Harriet Gardiner, who later became an Anglican nun and Sister Superior of Trinity Hospital in New York City) moved back to Maine for Tudor Gardiner to recover from rheumatism, gout and other conditions complicated by the harsh conditions of his decades of military service. Here Anne Gardiner bore another daughter (who died the following year), then three sons (two of them twins). Tudor Gardiner formally retired from the army in 1861, only to become general superintendent of recruiting for the Union Army in Maine, earning assistant adjutant general rank by the war's end.

In 1866, the family moved to Boston so young Robert could enroll in the Roxbury Latin School. Although he was a good student, the family uprooted again in 1869 to move to Canada and live with Tudor's brother, Robert Hallowell Gardiner II, who had married a prominent Savannah, Georgia, belle before the American Civil War (but ended up ostracised by both sides for his divided loyalties), and had moved to Canada to organize canals and railroads.

Other related Gardiners were prominent in the Anglican Church, including Rev. Frederick Gardiner, who became professor of biblical literature at Berkeley Divinity School in Middletown, Connecticut, and his sons Rev. Frederic Gardiner Jr. (dean of the Episcopal cathedral in Sioux Falls, South Dakota and later headmaster at the Pomfret School and Trinity College in Hartford, Connecticut), and John Hays Gardiner (who became a Harvard University professor and author of 'The Bible as English Literature').

Young Robert Hallowell Gardiner graduated from a Canadian high school at age 15, then after another year at Roxbury Latin, entered Harvard College. He ultimately graduated eighth in his class of 142, then taught languages for several years.

In 1878, Robert Hallowell Gardiner entered Harvard Law School. However, his father's death forced him to drop out and support his widowed mother, as well as sister and teenaged twin brothers.

Robert married Alice Bangs, of a distinguished Boston family which included many lawyers, on June 23, 1881. They ultimately had five children: Robert Hallowell IV (b. 1882), Alice (b. 1885), Sylvester (1888-1889), Anna Lowell (b. 1890) and William Tudor (b. 1892).

== Legal career ==
Gardiner read law with James J. Storrow and William Minor, and was admitted to the Massachusetts bar in 1880. He established a law office in Boston, which he maintained for decades, even after he moved his legal residence to Maine in 1900. He helped to found the Republican Club of Massachusetts and served as president of the local Brotherhood Council of Boston and vice president of the Massachusetts branch of the National Consumers League, as well as a director of Arlington Mills, Webster and Atlas Bank, and the Tampa Electric Company. Gardiner created and represented many trusts, including the Boston Real Estate Trust and the Hotel Touraine Trust, and traveled extensively for both his wealthy legal clients and Christian activities, until he retired from his thriving legal practice in 1918 to concentrate on Christian activities.

== Christian activist ==
Robert Gardiner served on the Standing Committee of the Diocese of Massachusetts for many years, and as junior or senior warden of Christ Church from 1901-1924, as well as treasurer of the Episcopal City Mission and Diocesan Board of Missions for Massachusetts and later Maine. He became known for his advocacy of Christian Education (Sunday Schools as well as adult education and theological education) and youth development (serving as President of the Brotherhood of St. Andrew (of boys and young men) from 1904 until ___. He was appointed to the Joint Commission on Sunday School Instruction in 1904, and became a trustee of the General Theological Seminary in 1907.

He also served as General Convention delegate seven times, and on the General Board of Religious Education (GBRE) with bishops Ethelbert Talbot, Chauncey Brewster, David H. Greer, Thomas F. Gailor and Edward L. Parsons, as well as distinguished laymen Nicholas Murray Butler (president of Columbia University) and George Wharton Pepper (future Senator and the prominent in the University of Pennsylvania law faculty and Philadelphia bar). Gardiner became the GBRE's vice-president in 1913. Under his influence, the GBRE cooperated with the Federal Council of Churches, the Council of Church Boards of Education, the College YMCA and YWCA, and the Sunday School Council. In the General Convention of 1919, Gardiner proposed an amendment to the church's constitution to allow women as well as men to serve as delegates, particularly in light of their contributions as deaconesses and lay women and women just having received the right to vote in U.S. elections. While he succeeded in raising the matter, his proposal was defeated, and the church's constitution instead amended to segregate women, so that they were not seated for an additional fifty years.

== Ecumenist ==
Upon retiring from the Brotherhood of St. Andrew for health reasons, Gardiner took some time to recuperate, then plunged himself into ecumenical work, especially with his friend Bishop Brent. After Brent's speech in Cincinnati in October 1910, the General Convention elected a Joint Commission on Faith and Order, with Chicago bishop Charles P. Anderson as President and Gardiner as Secretary, and financed with $100,000 from J. Pierpont Morgan. By the following April, he had helped secure the participation of eighteen American Protestant churches, and plans had been made to start formal communications with the Roman Catholic Church, the Old Catholic Churches and Orthodox Churches. However, it took another ten years before the American Episcopalians, who had funded the idea of the Faith and Order Conference, could transfer that role to an organization representative of Anglicans, Lutheran, Orthodox, Reformed and other European and American churches. In May 1913, Gardiner reported that 22 commissions had been appointed in the United States, Canada and England, and 7,580 persons of many churches were on their mailing list, which included all European countries, Arabia and Palestine, Ceylon, China, India, Japan and Korea, as well as Persia, Syria and Turkey. In the summer of 1914, Gardiner wrote to Cardinal Gasparri, and received a favorable reply from the Holy See. However, as delegates gathered in Constance, Switzerland in August, 1914, World War I broke out, dashing their hopes (and forcing Gardiner and other delegates to flee before German railroads closed, although German authorities accorded them special protection as they traveled to Cologne and then London).

Gardiner, stunned, at first returned to his law practice, but soon recovered his ecumenical focus and managed to help organize a congress of 304 Protestant missionaries in Panama City in February 1916, including leaders from the Caribbean, Central and South America who had been omitted from the Edinburgh conference in 1910. However, Bishop William T. Manning nearly blocked formal Episcopal participation in the conference, until George Wharton Pepper and Rev. Arthur Seldon Lloyd went to work. Gardiner also continued to keep open communications with the Russian Orthodox Church and with the assistance of John Mott, helped avoid an influx of Protestant missionaries into that country in upheaval at war's end. Communications with Archbishops Platon and Tikhon also continued through Stalin's persecutions, and with the Catholic church (often with the help of fellow attorney George Zabriskie and his Catholic contacts in New York City).

He continued his efforts at war's end, despite Vatican upset about Protestant missionaries distributing their bibles in Italy, and other issues that torpedoed overtures made by midwestern bishops Anderson and Reginald Weller. Ecumenical dialogue proved more fruitful in Adelaide, Australia, and in 1920 the Lambeth Conference issued its "Appeal to all Christian People". Moreover, in November, 1919 a conference in New York City with Episcopalians, Baptists, Congregationalists, Disciples of Christ, Lutherns and other Protestant denominations, as well as Orthodox Armenians, Greeks and Bulgarians called upon Gardiner to bring together another preliminary meeting of the Faith and Order assembly. Thus, Gardiner helped organize another world conference that gathered in Geneva in August 1920, with Bishop Charles Brent elected Chairman of the Continuation Committee, George Zabriskie Treasurer and Gardiner as secretary. During that same month and city, the Life and Work conference was organized by Swedish Archbishop Nathan Soderblom with the participation of many central European churches, many of them deeply disturbed by the anti-German terms of the Versailles Peace Treaty.

Although the Continuation Committee met several times, and secured participation of Orthodox Churches, Gardiner did not leave to see his dream's fulfillment, for he died before the committee's second formal meeting in 1925, which set the date for the World Conference on Faith and Order for Lausanne in August 1927. Gardiner had fallen seriously ill from overwork on April 22, 1922. By that November, he had recovered enough to report to the Continuation Committee that he had spent $7800 out of his own pocket (that would increase to $12,074.24 by year's end). However, his own Church's finance committee failed to make any appropriation for the World Conference in the budget for 1923, 1924 nor 1925. A.C.A. Hall and Frederick C. Morehouse of his own Episcopal Church opposed church unity and their denomination's participation in the Federal Council of Churches (the House of Bishops rejecting such participation in 1919). Still, however, he persisted in bringing together for dialogue many people who had no intention of conversing with each other, and he received good news just before Easter, 1923—reports from group conferences of the Y.M.C.A. and Anglican, Baptist, Congregational, Churches of Christ, Disciples of Christ, Eastern Orthodox, Lutheran, Mar Thoma Syrian, Methodist, Old Catholics, Polish Marianite, Presbyterian, Society of Friends, South India United and even Roman Catholic churches. The following March he wrote "Difficulties are a joy, for they give one the chance to put out his full strength in the effort to try to overcome them, as long as the Lord gives me health and strength I am going to stick to my job."

== Death and legacy ==
Gardiner died at his home, Oaklands, on June 15, 1924, after a week's bout with pneumonia. His wife was convinced that he did not know he was dying, for he kept talking in a dream about letters he had wanted to write, even as she gathered their children around his bed. Zabriskie in the United States and Canon Bate in England continued his work, using their scholarly, linguistic and administrative talents to the full, as had Gardiner.
