= Zions Hill =

United States historic place

- The Brewster Inn
- U.S. National Register of Historic Places
- U.S. Historic district
- Location within Maine Location within the United States
- Location: 37 Zions Hill, Dexter, Maine
- Coordinates: 45°1′23″N 69°17′42″W
- Area: 2.2 acres (0.89 ha)
- Built: 1934
- Architect: Stevens & Stevens
- Architectural style: Colonial Revival
- NRHP reference No.: 89001705
- Added to NRHP: October 16, 1989

Zions Hill, also known as the Ralph Owen Brewster House, and now the Brewster Inn, is a historic house at 37 Zions Hill in Dexter, Maine. The house is a 1930s updating of an 1870s structure to a design by John Calvin Stevens and John Howard Stevens, who also designed the landscaping of the 2-acre (0.81 ha) property. This renovation was done for Ralph Owen Brewster, a prominent Maine politician who served as Governor of Maine and for two terms in the United States Senate, and created one of the major Colonial Revival showcases of interior Maine. The property was listed on the National Register of Historic Places in 1989.

== Description and history ==
Zions Hill is set prominently on the north side of the same-named road, on the fringe of Dexter's central village. The main house is set at the southeast corner of the landscaped property, with a semicircular drive in front. The house is a rambling wood-frame structure with a central mass that is a two-story L shape with a hip roof. In front of this block's two-bay facade is a deep porte-cochere that extends over the drive. A single-story sun-room occupies the crook of the L, extending further west than the rear leg of the L, where a long veranda extends to the rear. A two-story wing extends to the east, with a single-story conservatory area in front, and a garage and servant's quarters behind. The interior of the house has restrained woodwork reminiscent of the Federal period, and has retained original wallpaper, light fixtures, and draperies.

The structure of the main portion of the house was built in the 1870s by William E. Brewster, and it is in that house that Ralph Owen Brewster grew up. Brewster, educated at Bowdoin College, entered politics in the 1910s, serving in the state legislature before winning two terms as Governor of Maine 1924–29. In 1929 he purchased his father's house, and in 1934 retained the noted Portland firm of John Calvin Stevens and his son John Howard Stevens to significantly expand the house into a property suitable for a prominent politician. Brewster served three terms in the United States House of Representatives (1935–41) and then two terms in the Senate (1941–53). The house designed by the Stevenses, although essentially Colonial Revival in style, had to abandon the symmetry typical of that style to accommodate both the asymmetry of the original house, and the needs of the Brewsters for public spaces in which to conduct political business. The Stevenses were also responsible for designing the landscaping of the property, much of which has apparently been preserved despite conversion of the property to a bed and breakfast.

== See also ==
- National Register of Historic Places listings in Penobscot County, Maine
