= St. Thomas' Episcopal Parish Historic District =

Historic district in Maryland, United States

- U.S. National Register of Historic Places
- U.S. Historic district
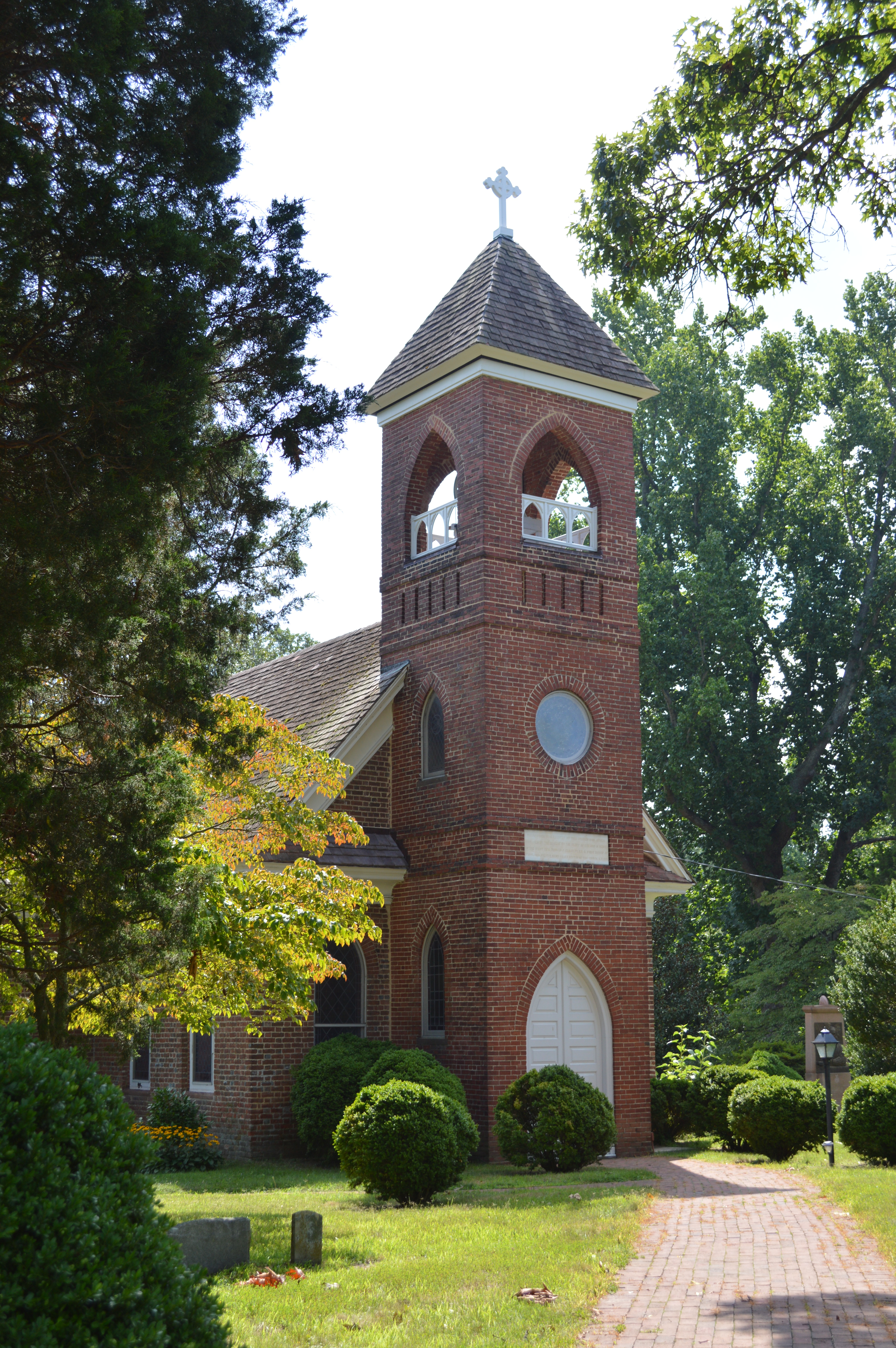
- Saint Thomas Episcopal Church, August 2014

- Location within Maryland Location within the United States
- Location: From east side of Croom Rd. along north & south sides of St. Thomas Church Rd., eastward for about 1500 ft., near Upper Marlboro, Maryland
- Coordinates: 38°44′51″N 76°45′29″W
- Area: 43.77 acres (17.71 ha)
- Built: 1742
- Built by: Page, Daniel; Tayman, Harry P.; Armstrong, H. and J.
- Architect: Priest, John W; Grigg, Milton
- Architectural style: Georgian, Gothic Revival
- NRHP reference No.: 11000963
- Added to NRHP: December 30, 2011

St. Thomas' Episcopal Parish Historic District is a national historic district located at Croom, Prince George's County, Maryland. The district encompasses four contributing buildings and three contributing sites associated with St. Thomas' Church. The other contributing buildings are the Gothic Revival style St. Thomas' Church Rectory (1852-1853), Tenant/Sexton's House (c. 1890), and tobacco barn (c. 1905). The contributing sites are the St. Thomas' Episcopal Church Cemetery, St. Simon's Mission Chapel Site, and St. Simon's Cemetery. The African-American communicants of St. Thomas' Church formed St. Simon's Mission Chapel in the late-19th century and it operated on the property associated with the Croome Industrial and Agricultural School (Croom Settlement School), which operated from about 1902 to 1952.

It was listed on the National Register of Historic Places in 2011.
