= Chapel of the Incarnation (Brandywine, Maryland) =

Historic church in Maryland, United States

- U.S. National Register of Historic Places
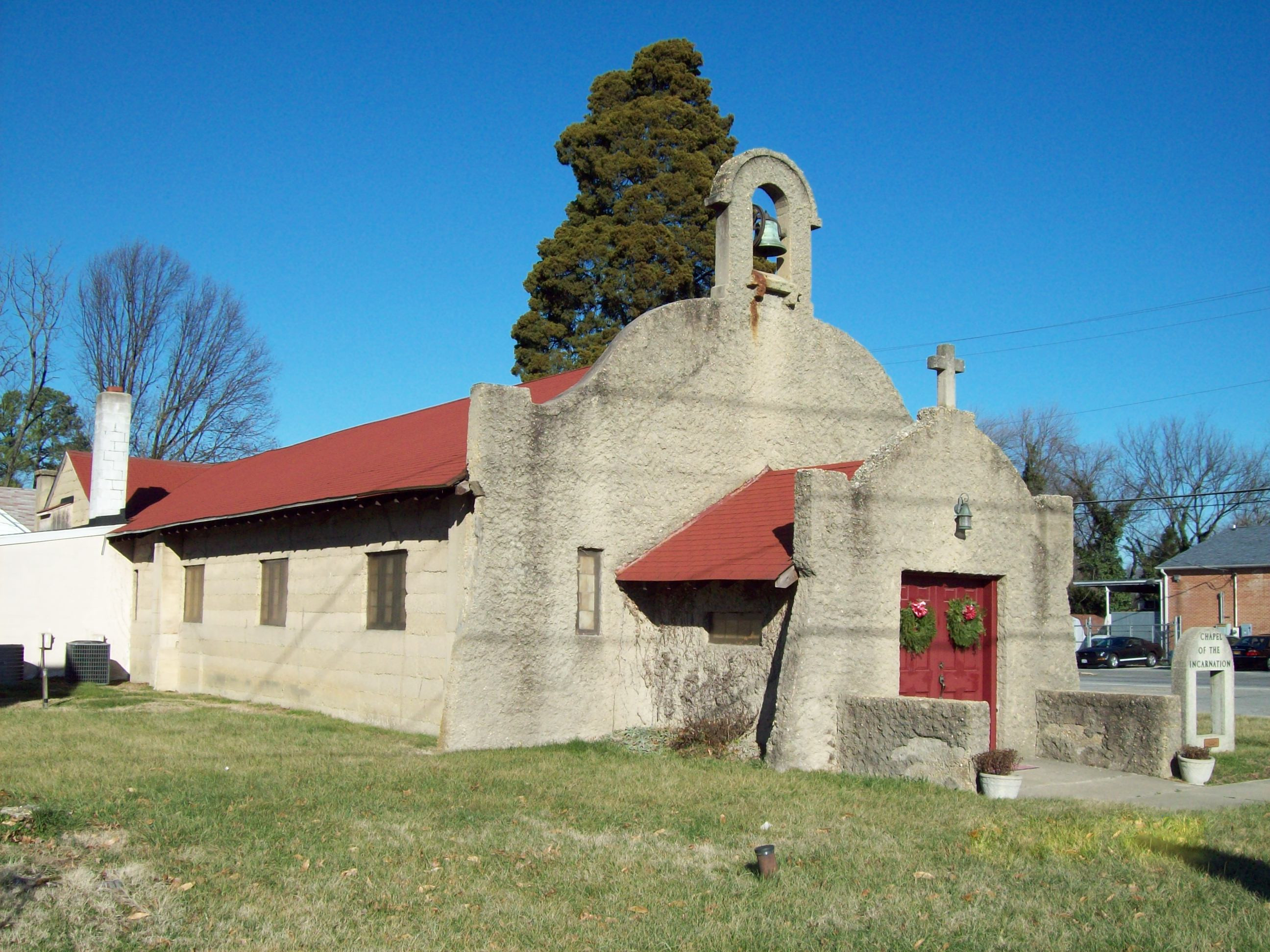
- Chapel of the Incarnation, December 2008

- Location within Maryland Location within the United States
- Location: 14070 Brandywine Rd., Brandywine, Maryland
- Coordinates: 38°41′51″N 76°51′10″W
- Area: 0.3 acres (0.12 ha)
- Built: 1916
- Built by: Palmer, William J.
- Architectural style: Mission/spanish Revival
- NRHP reference No.: 00001505
- Added to NRHP: December 13, 2000

The Chapel of the Incarnation is an L-shaped church building of the Mission style. It is located at 14070 Brandywine Rd., Brandywine, Prince George's County, Maryland.

The cornerstone was laid in September 1916, and the chapel opened for Mass early in 1917. The chapel's architect, William J. Palmer, who designed numerous residences and churches in Washington, D.C., prepared the plans and specifications for the church and attached Parish Hall. The Mission style may have been deemed appropriate to the church's status as a "mission chapel," or offshoot, of St. Thomas' Church in Croom, Maryland.

The chapel is constructed of poured-in-form concrete covered with a coarse pebble-filled stucco to resemble adobe. It is a one-story cross-gabled building with the entrance through the lower-gabled narthex. The structure is highlighted by a shaped parapet and bell tower. The interior is distinguished by its original altar balustrade and pulpit, and an ancient stone baptismal font brought from a church in England.

It was listed on the National Register of Historic Places in 1988.
