= St. Michael's Church (Reisterstown, Maryland) =

Historic church in Maryland, United States

- U.S. National Register of Historic Places
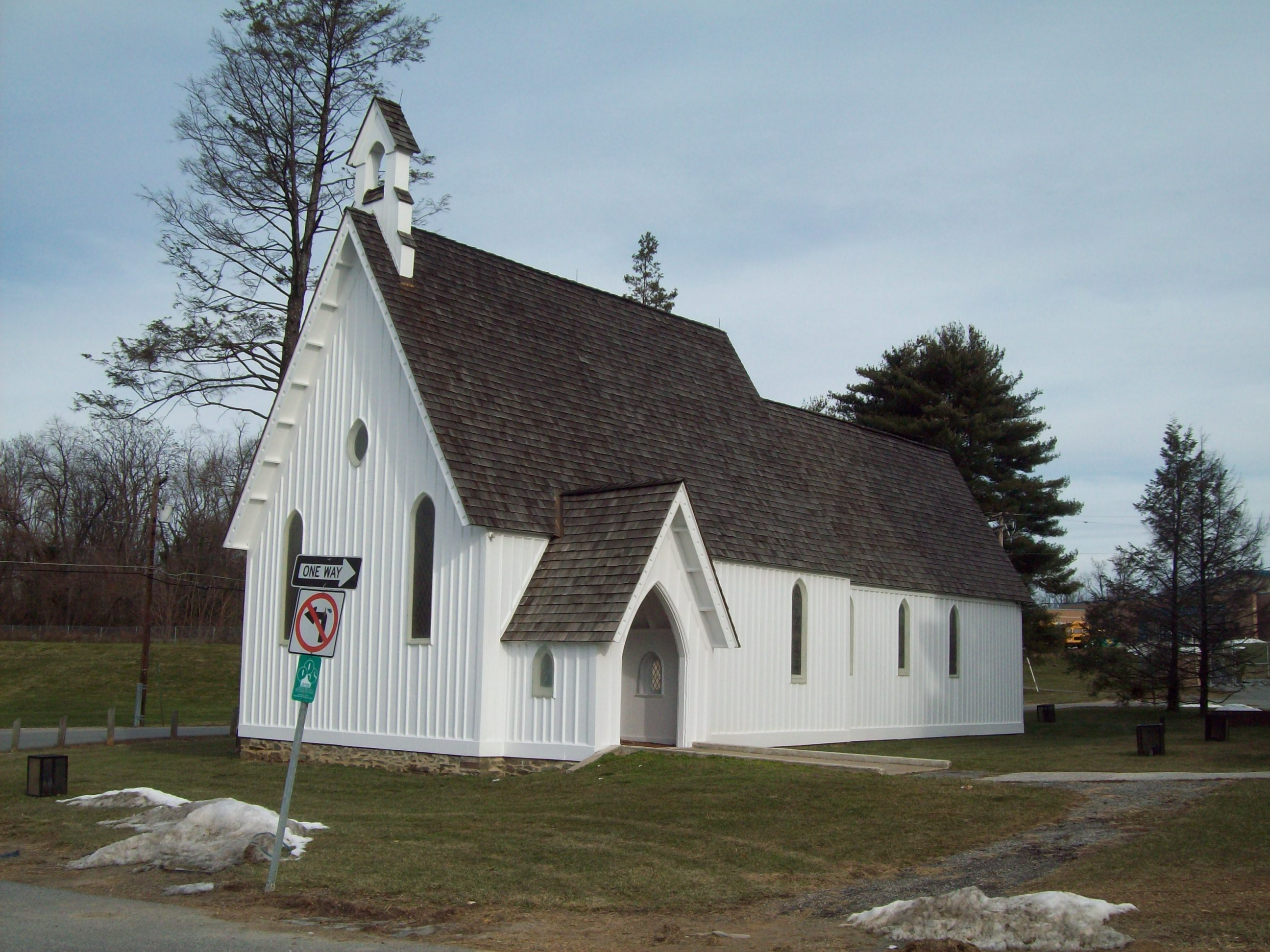
- St. Michael's Church, Reisterstown MD, December 2009

- Location within Maryland Location within the United States
- Location: Academy Lane and Reisterstown Rd., Reisterstown, Maryland
- Coordinates: 39°27′4″N 76°49′8″W
- Area: less than one acre
- Built: 1853
- Architect: John W. Priest
- Architectural style: Gothic Revival
- NRHP reference No.: 79003273
- Added to NRHP: October 22, 1979

St. Michael's Church, also known as St. Michael's Chapel and Hannah More Chapel, is a historic Episcopal Church located at Academy Lane and Reisterstown Road in Reisterstown, Baltimore County, Maryland. It is a small, Carpenter Gothic-style, board and batten frame structure, featuring a simple bell-gable. It was designed by New York architect John W. Priest (1825–1859), and constructed about 1853. It was named after Hannah More, and built on the grounds of Hannah More Academy.

The church was deconsecrated on May 12, 1978.

It was listed on the National Register of Historic Places in 1979.

Still owned by the Diocese of Maryland, a renovation project costing $1.2 million began in January 2003. On September 8, 2004, a ribbon-cutting ceremony was held for its reopening. The project included the replacement of roof shingles, a restoration of the interior, which had been destroyed by rainwater, and the removal of chimney bricks.

== Hannah More Academy ==
The Hannah More Academy was founded in 1829 under the name of Locust Grove Seminary (Note: Not to be confused for the school near Pittsburgh, Pennsylvania or what is now the Episcopal Church Home Association in Pittsburgh, located at this school from 1862) in Reisterstown, Maryland by a Mrs Neilson. Writing her will in 1832, Mrs Neilson left money and land for the academy now renamed after the English poet and playwright Hannah More. It went into effect two years later when she died. (Note: Sources differ on the starting date of the Academy, counting from the original Seminary's opening (1829), the date of Mrs Neilson's will (1832) when the Seminary was renamed, or the date when the will took effect (1834)) It was the oldest episcopal boarding school in the United States. In 1853, a church was built on the grounds, the Hannah More chapel, also known as St. Michael's Church. In 1857, the main school building burned to the ground. In 1873, the academy became the Diocesan School for the Episcopal Diocese of Maryland. In 1972, after accruing large debt, the school's charter and enrollment was transferred to St. Timothy's School in Stevenson, Maryland. The Diocesan School for the Episcopal Diocese of Maryland closed in 1974 and the grounds were sold.

== Gallery ==
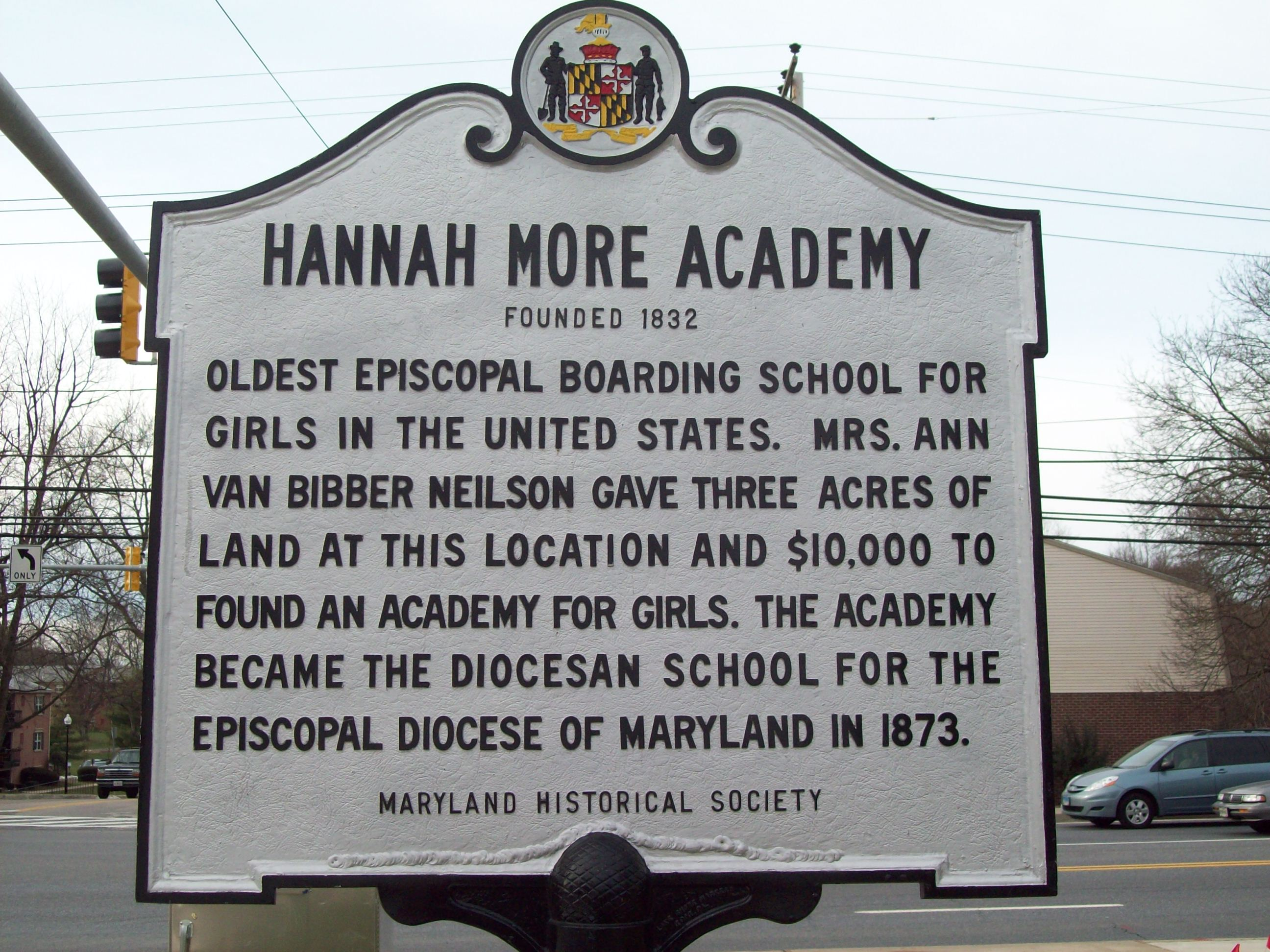
Hannah More Academy Marker, December 2009

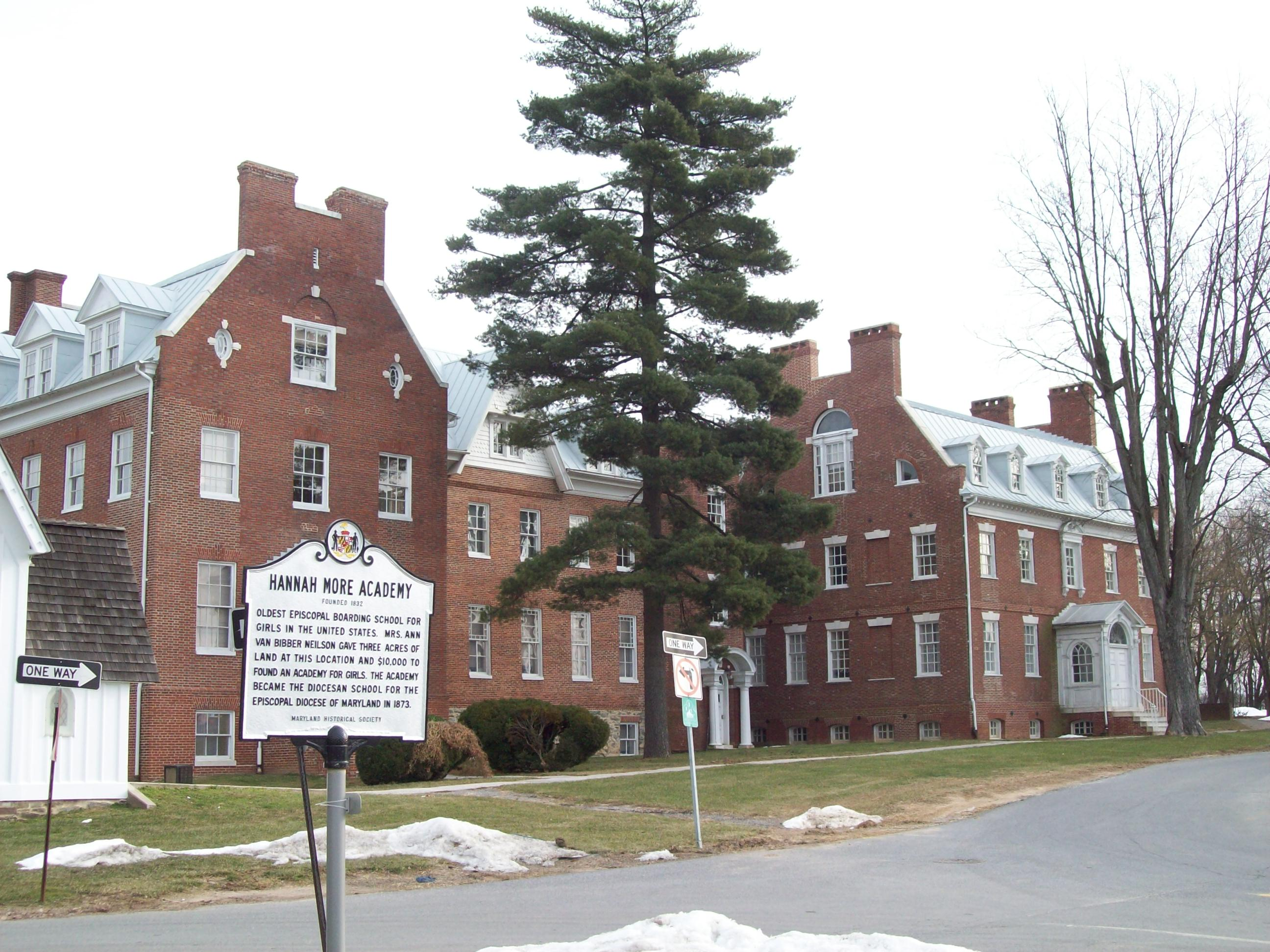
Hannah More Academy Building, December 2009

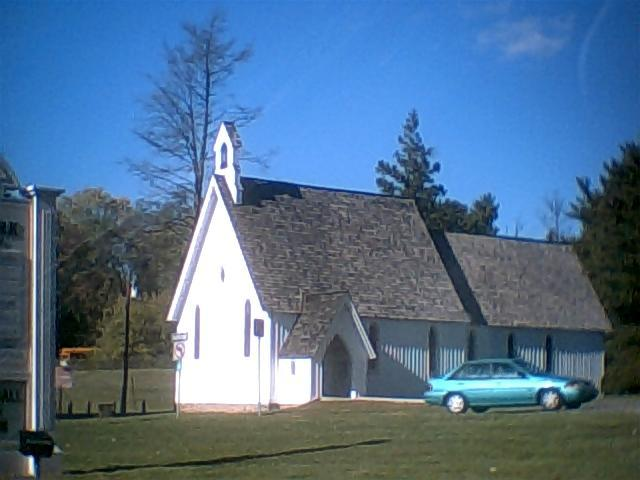
A picture of the Church in October 2010.
