= 1926 Maine gubernatorial election =

- September 13, 1926
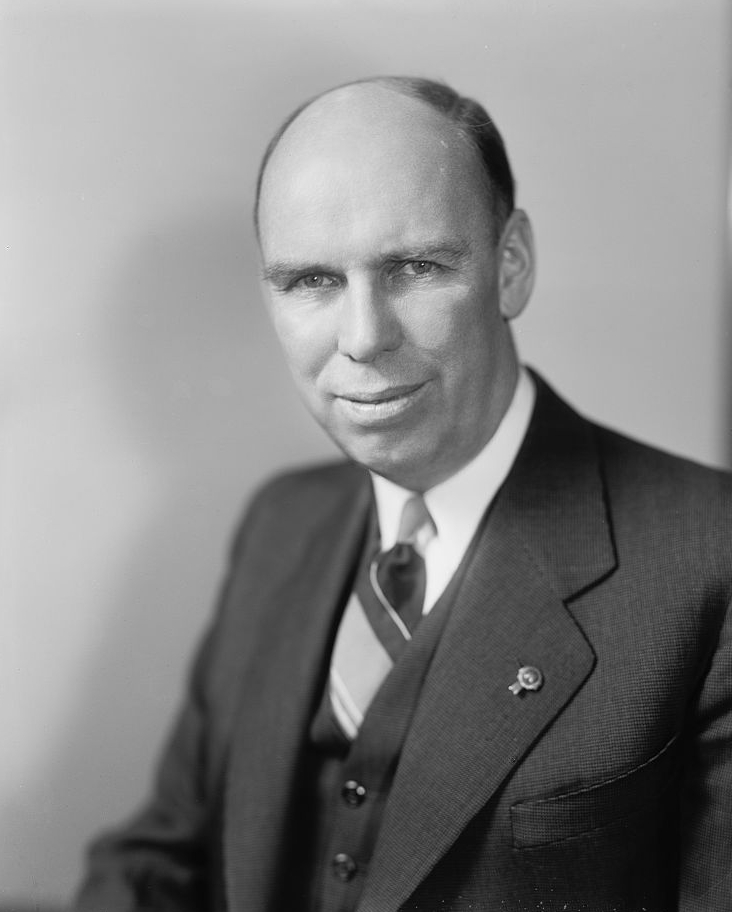

Nominee	Ralph Owen Brewster	Ernest L. McLean
Party	Republican	Democratic
Popular vote	100,776	80,748
Percentage	55.52%	44.48%
- County results Brewster: 50–60% 60–70% McLean: 50–60%
Governor before election
Ralph Owen Brewster
Republican
Elected Governor
Ralph Owen Brewster
Republican

The 1926 Maine gubernatorial election took place on September 13, 1926. Incumbent Republican Governor Ralph Owen Brewster defeated Democratic candidate Ernest L. McLean.

== Results ==
1926 Maine gubernatorial election
Party	Candidate	Votes	%	±%
Republican	Ralph Owen Brewster (incumbent)	100,776	55.52%	
Democratic	Ernest L. McLean	80,748	44.48%	
Majority		20,028	11.04%	
Turnout		181,524	100.00%	
Republican hold		Swing		
