= 1928 Maine gubernatorial election =

- September 10, 1928
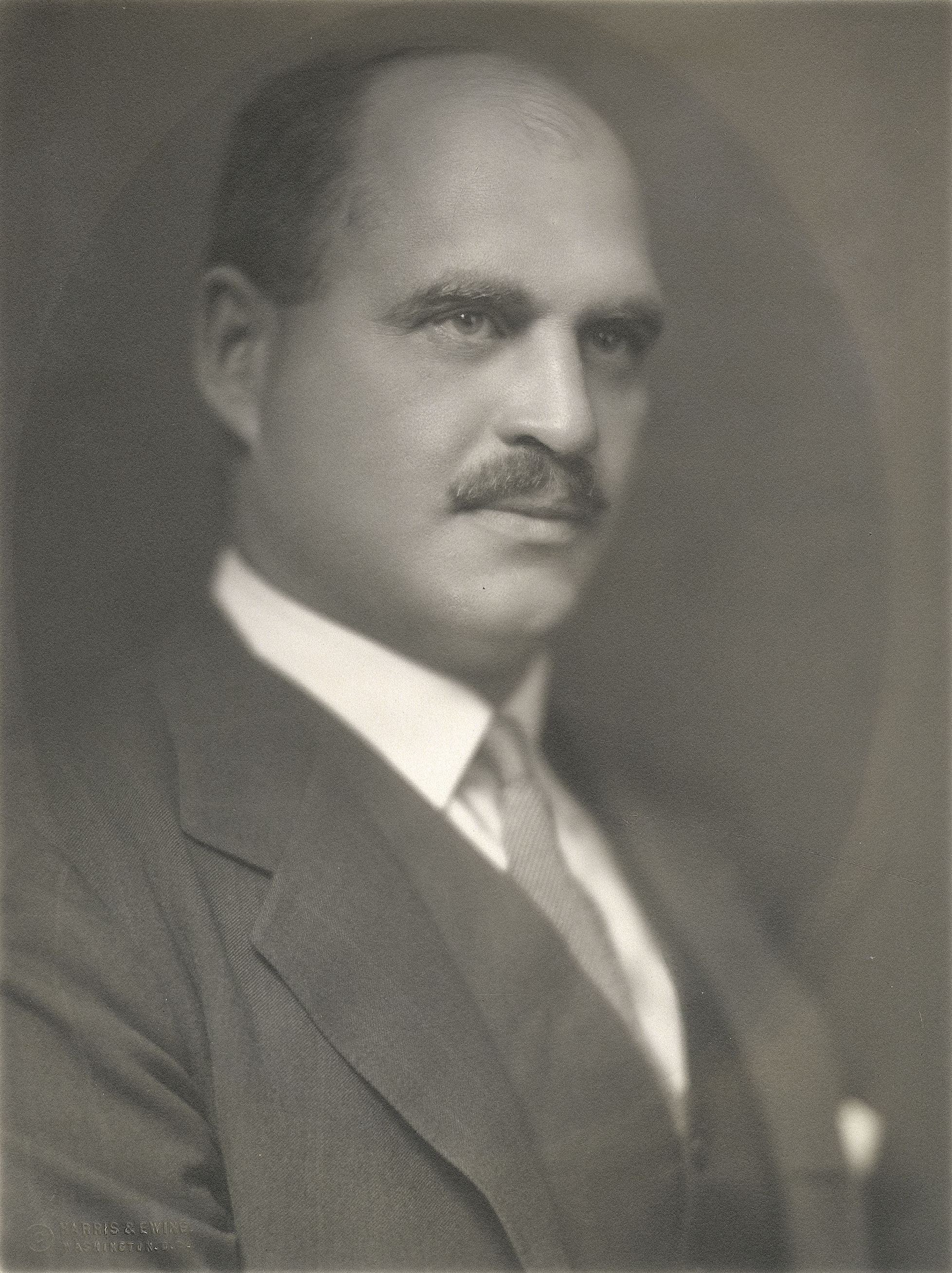

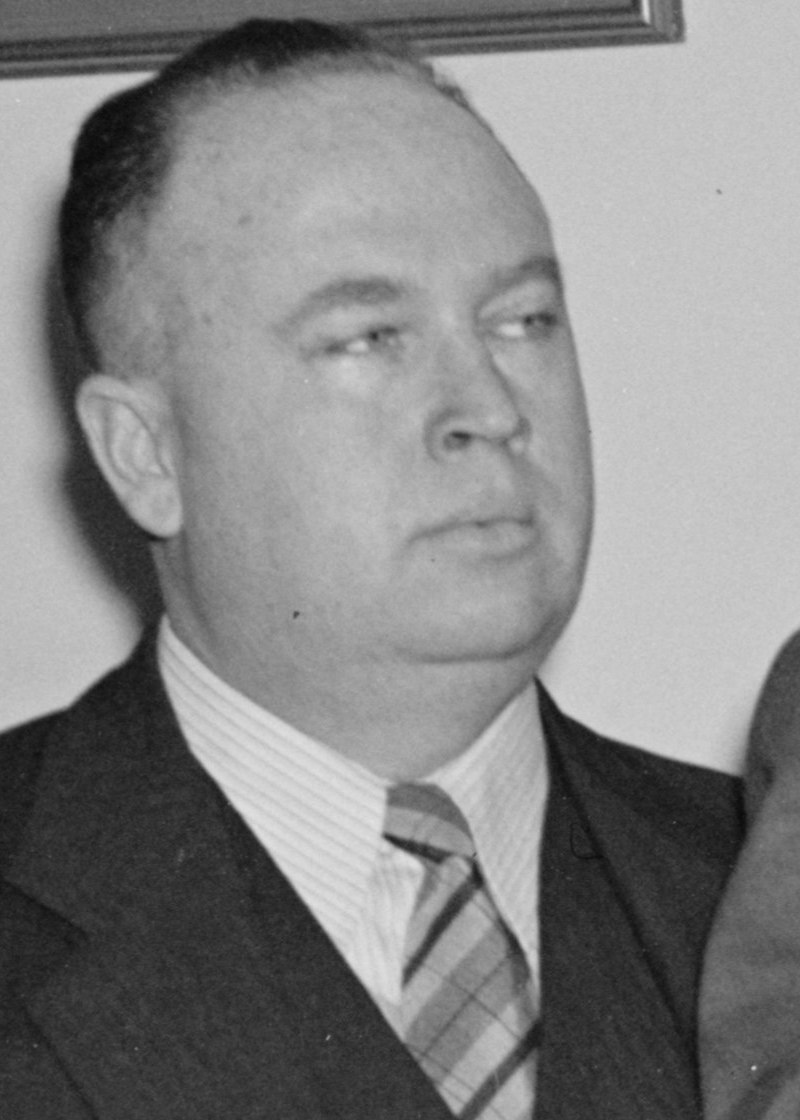
Nominee	William Tudor Gardiner	Edward C. Moran Jr.
Party	Republican	Democratic
Popular vote	148,053	65,572
Percentage	69.31%	30.69%
- County results Gardiner: 50–60% 60–70% 70–80%
Governor before election
Ralph Owen Brewster
Republican
Elected Governor
William Tudor Gardiner
Republican

The 1928 Maine gubernatorial election took place on September 10, 1928. Incumbent Republican Governor Ralph Owen Brewster retired to run for U.S. Senate. Republican candidate William Tudor Gardiner defeated Democratic candidate Edward C. Moran Jr.

== Results ==
1928 Maine gubernatorial election
Party	Candidate	Votes	%	±%
Republican	William Tudor Gardiner (incumbent)	148,053	69.31%	
Democratic	Edward C. Moran Jr.	65,572	30.69%	
Majority		82,481	38.61%	
Turnout		213,625	100.00%	
Republican hold		Swing		
