= 1946 United States Senate election in Maine =

- September 9, 1946
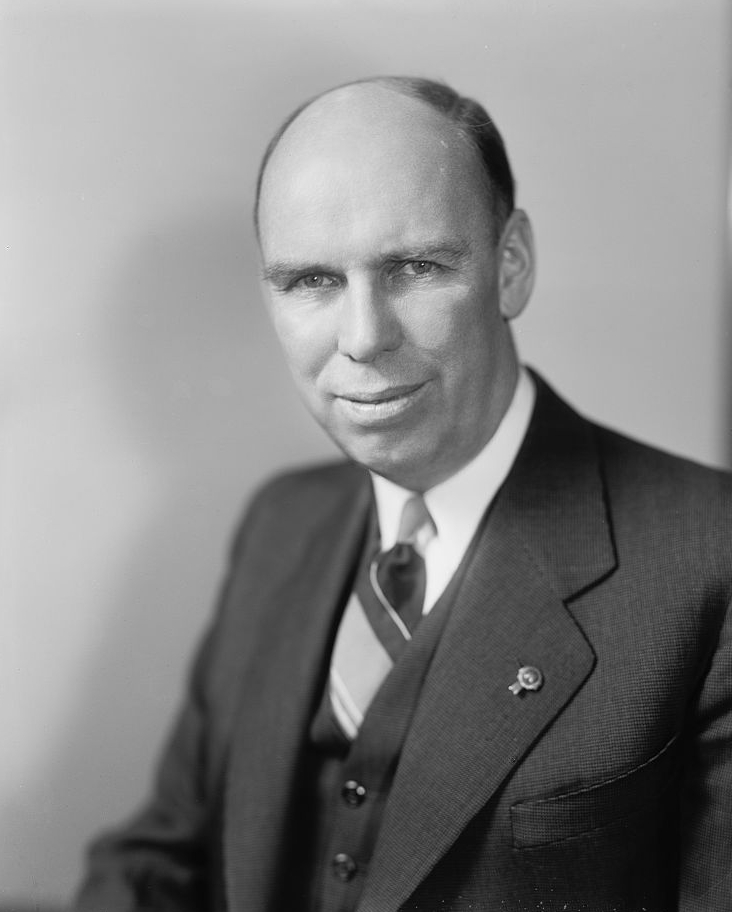

Nominee	Owen Brewster	Peter McDonald
Party	Republican	Democratic
Popular vote	111,215	82,665
Percentage	63.55%	36.45%
- County results Brewster: 50–60% 60–70% 70–80% 80–90% McDonald: 50–60%
U.S. senator before election
Owen Brewster
Republican
Elected U.S. Senator
Owen Brewster
Republican

The 1946 United States Senate election in Maine was held on September 9, 1946.

Incumbent Republican Senator Owen Brewster was re-elected to a second term in office over Democrat Peter McDonald.

== Republican primary ==
=== Candidates ===
- Owen Brewster, incumbent Senator since 1941

=== Results ===
Senator Brewster was unopposed for re-nomination.

1946 Republican U.S. Senate primary
Party	Candidate	Votes	%
Republican	Owen Brewster (inc.)	51,260	100.00%
Total votes		51,260	100.00%

== Democratic primary ==
=== Candidates ===
- Peter McDonald, unsuccessful candidate for U.S. Representative in 1940

=== Results ===
McDonald was unopposed for the Democratic nomination.

1946 Democratic U.S. Senate primary
Party	Candidate	Votes	%
Democratic	Peter McDonald	10,192	100.00%
Total votes		10,192	100.00%

== General election ==
=== Results ===
1946 U.S. Senate election in Maine
Party	Candidate	Votes	%	±%
Republican	Owen Brewster (inc.)	111,215	63.55%	▲4.94
Democratic	Peter McDonald	63,799	36.45%	▼4.82
Total votes		175,014	100.00%	

== See also ==
- 1946 United States Senate elections
