= St. Thomas' Church (Upper Marlboro, Maryland) =

Historic church in Maryland, United States

- U.S. National Register of Historic Places
- U.S. Historic district – Contributing property
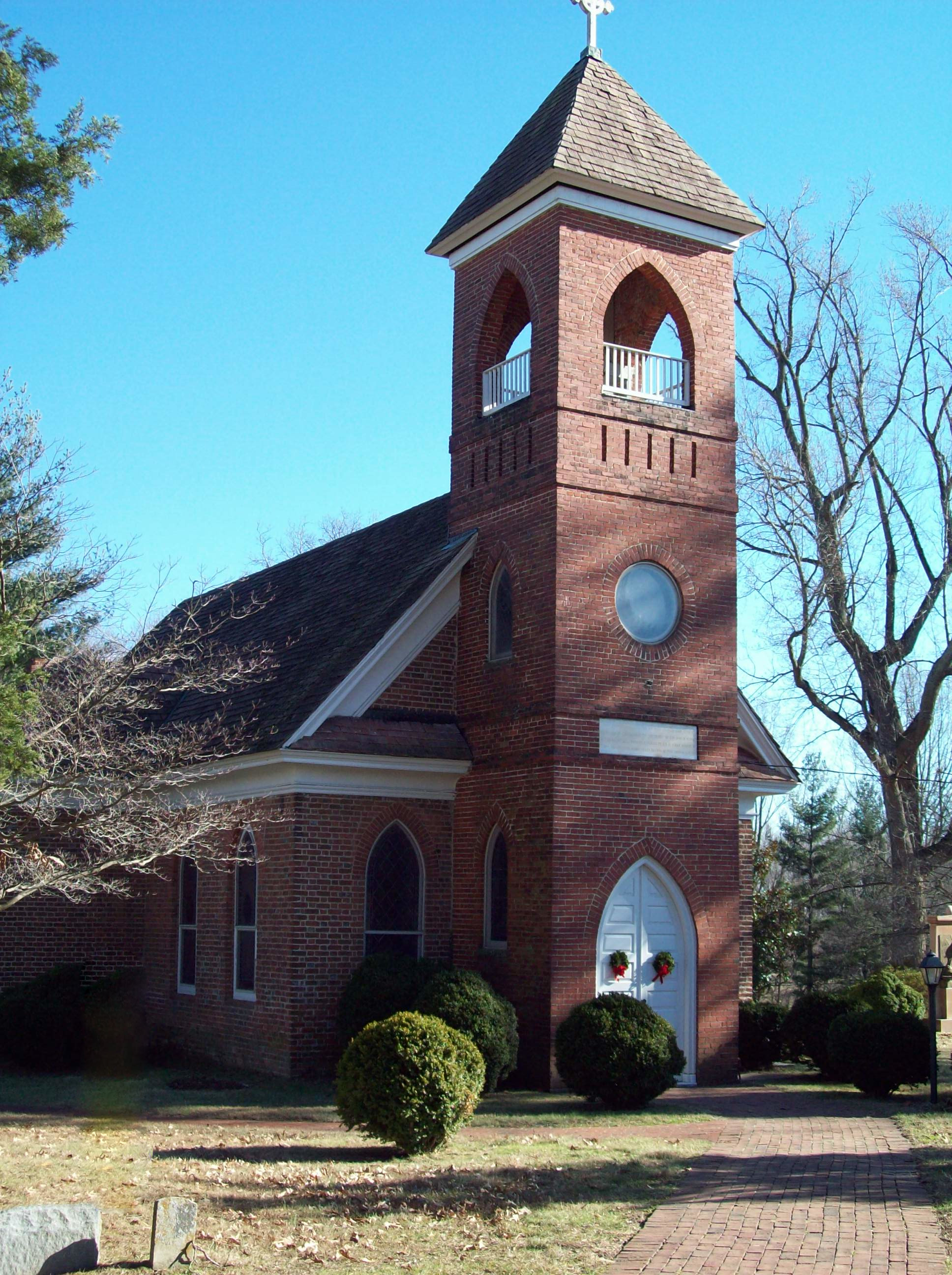
- St. Thomas' Church - Front View, December 2008

- Location within Maryland Location within the United States
- Location: 14300 St. Thomas Church Rd., near Upper Marlboro, Maryland
- Coordinates: 38°44′56″N 76°45′24″W
- Area: 18.8 acres (7.6 ha)
- Built: 1742
- Built by: Page, Daniel
- Architectural style: Georgian, Gothic Revival
- NRHP reference No.: 00001504
- Added to NRHP: December 13, 2000

St. Thomas' Church is an Episcopal church in a rural setting, located at Croom, Prince George's County, Maryland. It is one of four congregations that have constituted the parish of St. Thomas in the Episcopal Diocese of Washington, the others including the Church of the Atonement in Cheltenham, the Chapel of the Incarnation in Brandywine, and St. Simon's Mission also in Croom.

The original church was constructed between 1742 and 1745, and is one of the earliest Episcopal churches in Southern Maryland. With the adjacent cemetery, St. Simon's Mission, and St. Simon's Cemetery, it forms part of the St. Thomas' Episcopal Parish Historic District.

== History ==
The church was completed on December 25, 1745, and was unofficially known as "Page's Chapel," as the landowner, Daniel Page, had been contracted to erect the structure. In 1850, St. Thomas' became its own parish and undertook Gothic Revival renovations and expansion under the direction of New York City architect, John W. Priest, an associate of Andrew Jackson Downing. In 1888, the frontal bell tower was erected in memory of Bishop Thomas John Claggett, first Bishop of the Protestant Episcopal Church consecrated in the United States. Recent restoration work, in 1954, was based on the specifications of the original 1740s building contract, but retained Priest's Gothic Revival additions. The church is surrounded on all sides by a cemetery, which contains the graves of many prominent citizens and old county families. A fence and cast iron gate posts with Gothic designs was installed in 1907.

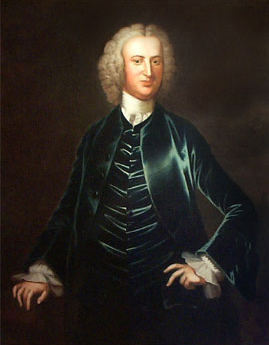
Benedict Swingate Calvert, one of the founders of St Thomas' Church, painted by John Wollaston c1754.

One of the original founders and benefactors of St Thomas's church was Benedict Swingate Calvert (1730-1788) who was a Maryland Loyalist during the American Revolution. He was the son of Charles Calvert, 5th Baron Baltimore, the third Proprietor Governor of Maryland, (1699–1751), and may have been the grandson of King George I of Great Britain. His mother's identity is not known and, as he was illegitimate, he was not able to inherit his father's title or estates, which passed instead to his half brother Frederick Calvert, 6th Baron Baltimore (1731–1771). He spent most of his life as a politician and planter in Maryland, though Frederick, by contrast, never visited the colony. Calvert became wealthy through proprietarial patronage and became an important colonial official, but he would lose his offices and his political power, though not his land and wealth, during the American Revolution. He is buried beneath the chancel of the church along with his wife Elizabeth Calvert (1731 – 1788) and daughter Eleanor Calvert (1757/1758 – September 28, 1811).

The church was listed on the National Register of Historic Places in 2000.

== Gallery ==
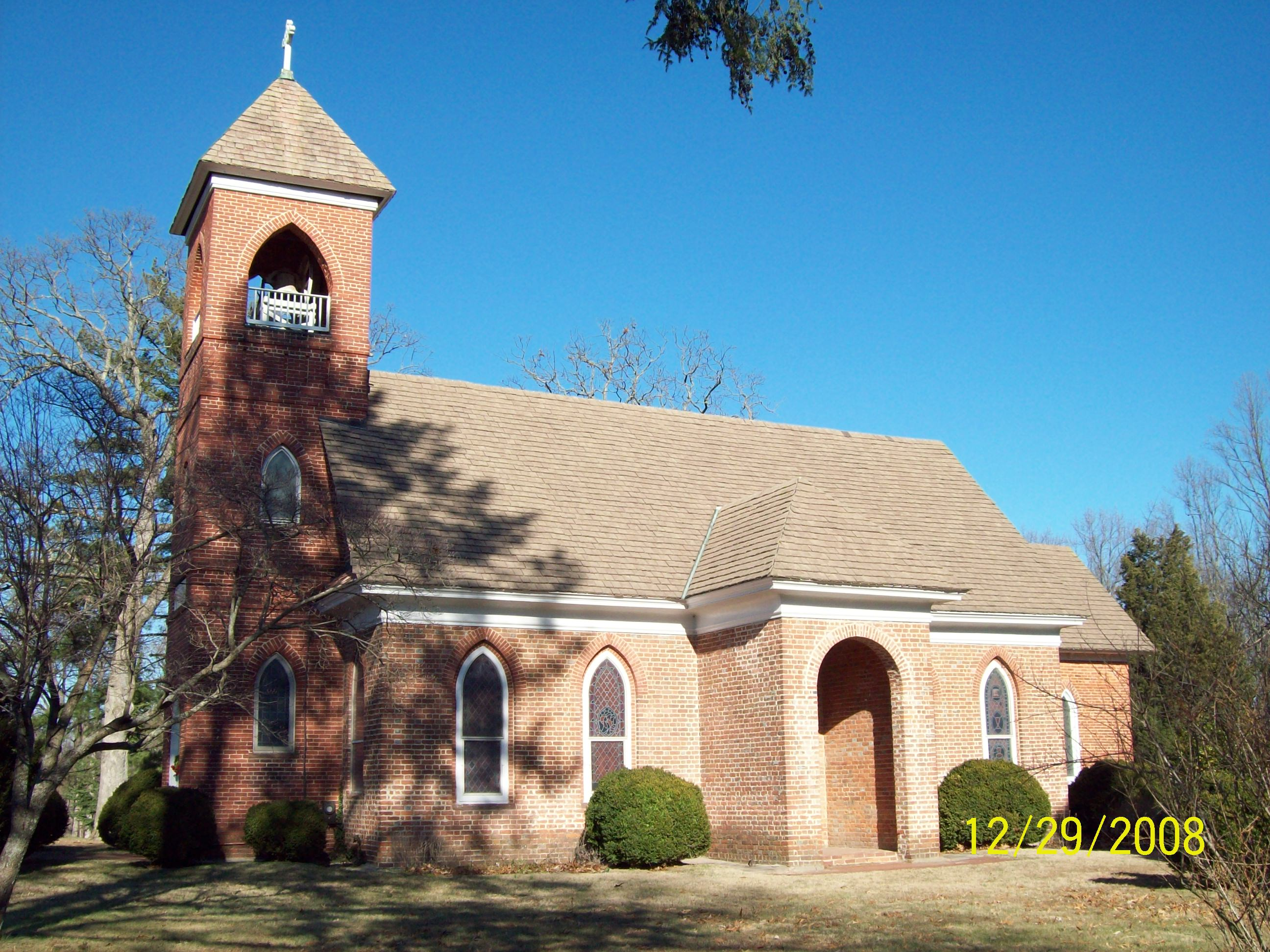
St. Thomas' Church - Side View, December 2008

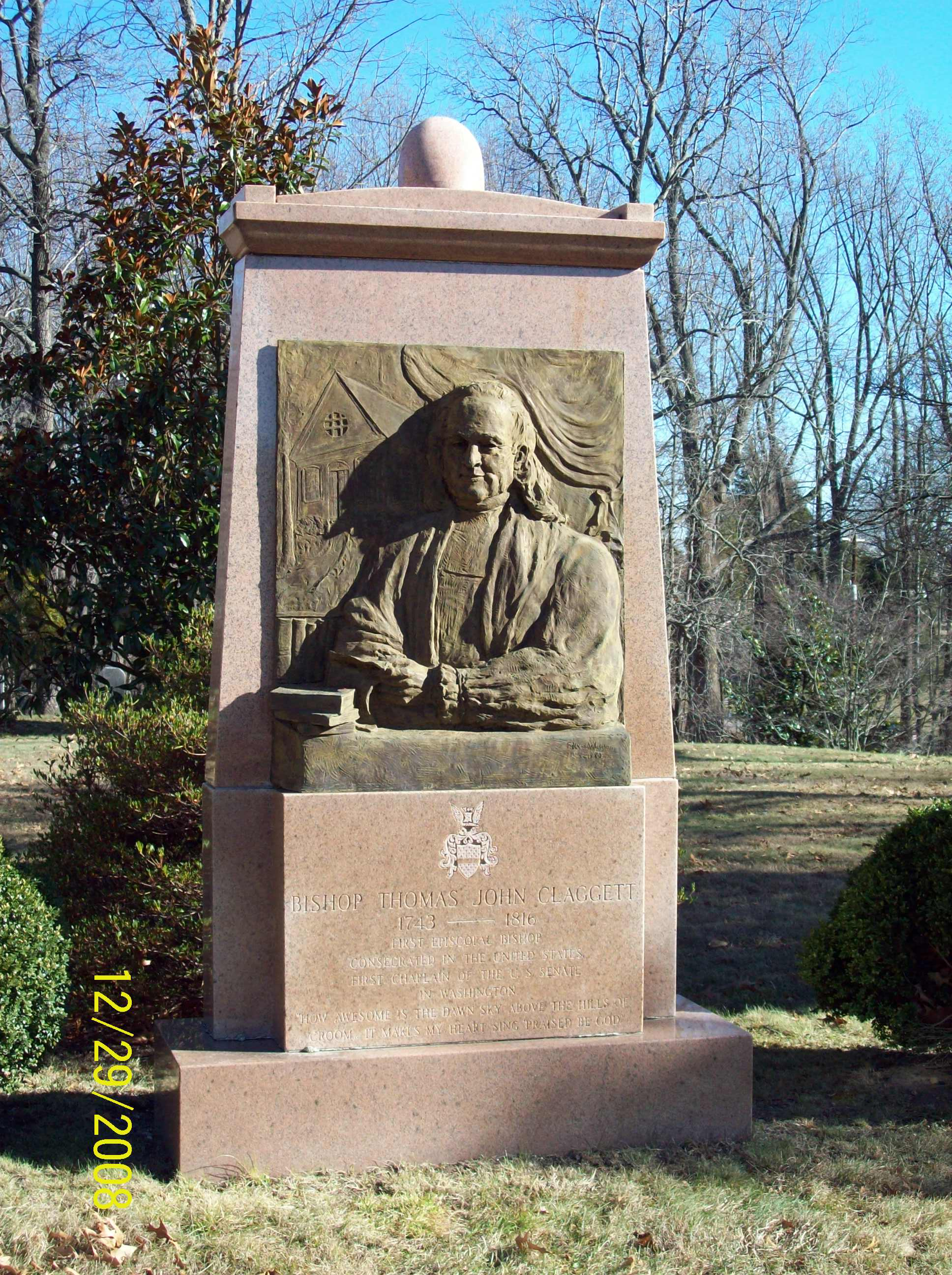
St. Thomas' Church - Claggett Memorial, December 2008

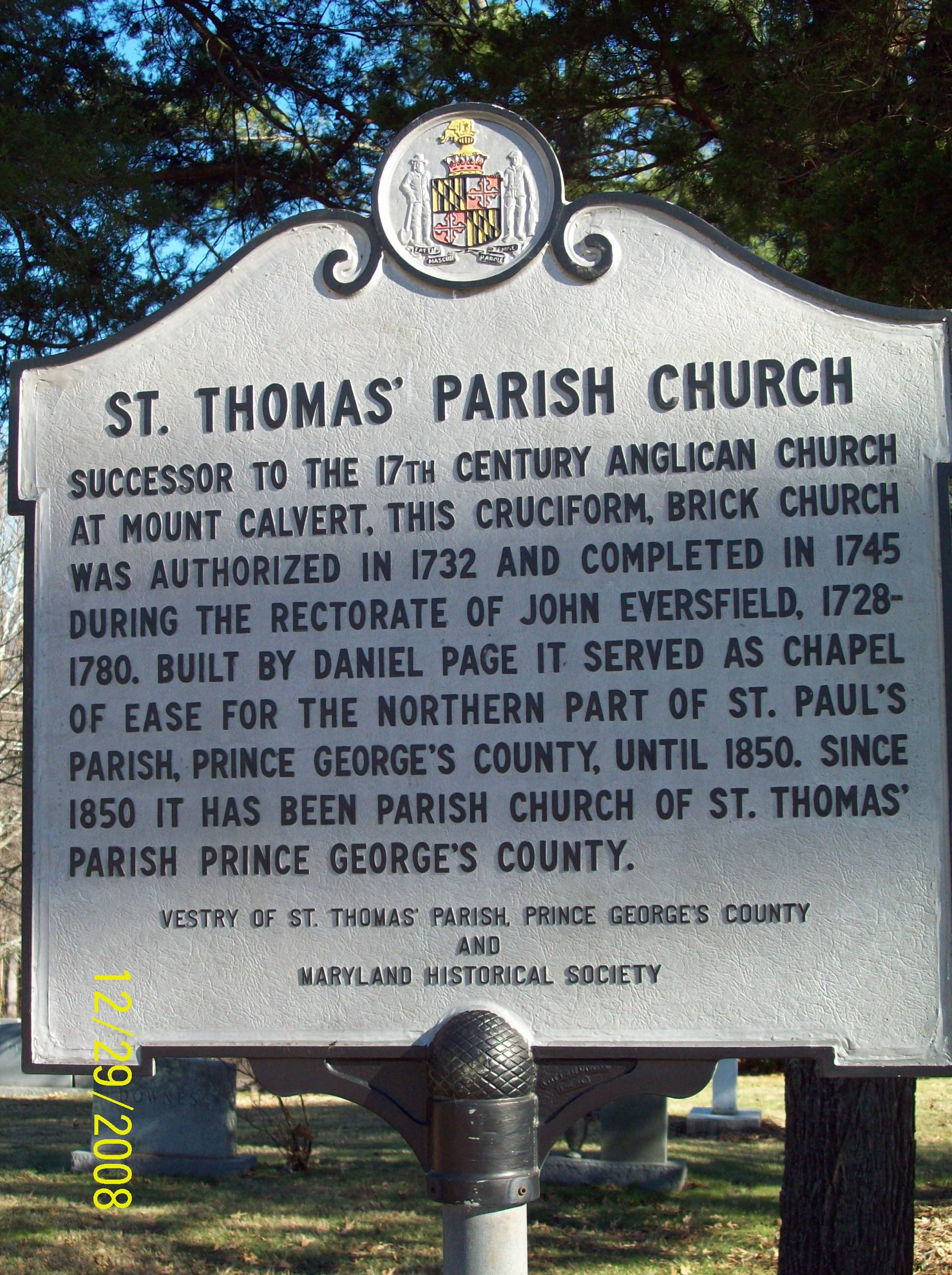
St. Thomas' Church - Historic Marker, December 2008
