= William Tudor Gardiner =

American politician (1892–1953)

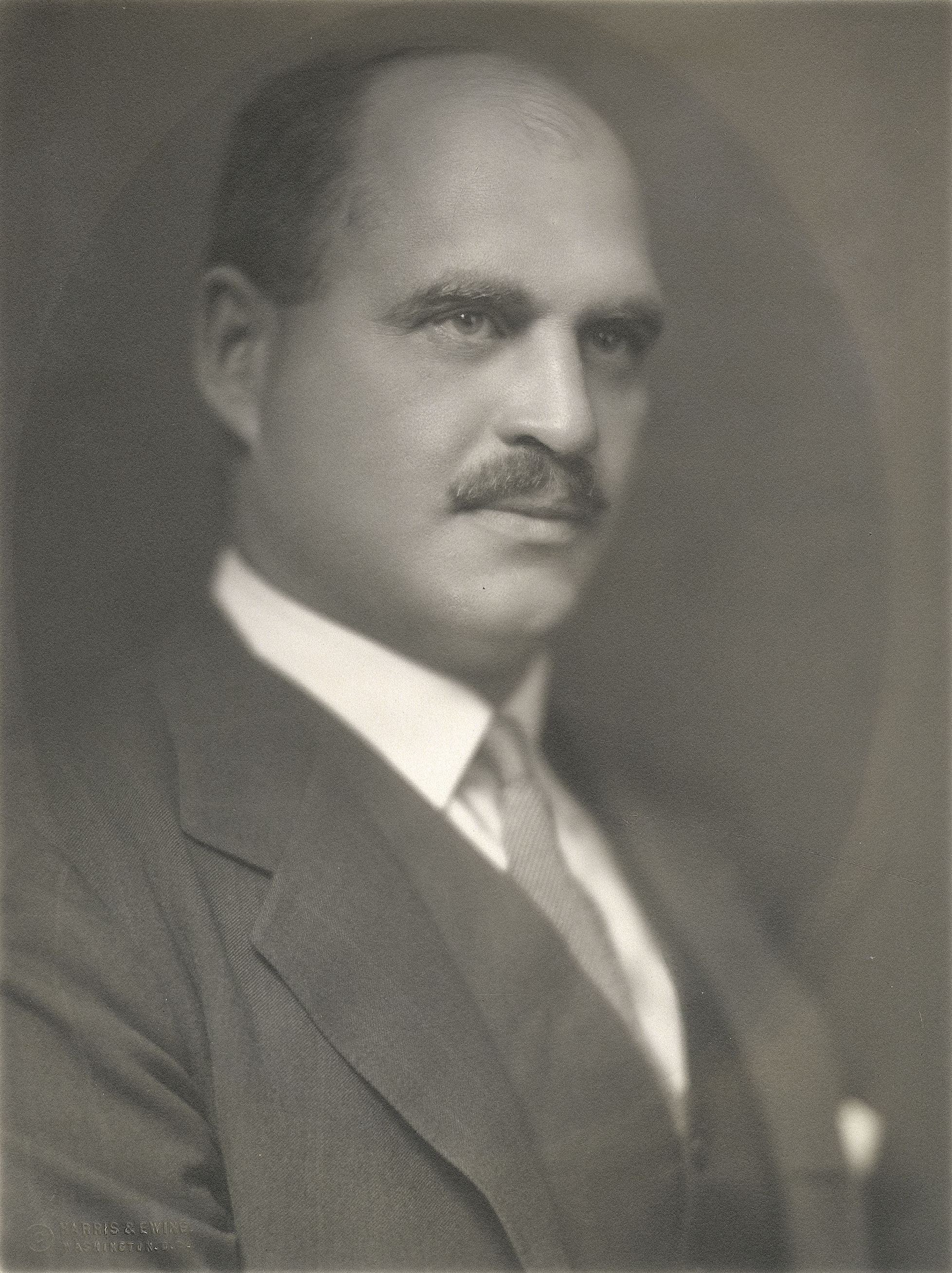

55th Governor of Maine
- In office January 2, 1929 – January 4, 1933
- Preceded by: Owen Brewster
- Succeeded by: Louis J. Brann

Maine House of Representatives
- In office 1920–1926

Personal details
- Born: William Tudor Gardiner; June 12, 1892 Newton, Massachusetts, U.S.
- Died: August 3, 1953 (aged 61) Schnecksville, Pennsylvania, U.S.
- Party: Republican
- Spouse: Margaret Thomas
- Children: 4
- Education: Groton School; Harvard University

William Tudor Gardiner (June 12, 1892 – August 3, 1953) was an American politician and the 55th governor of Maine.

== Early life ==
Gardiner was born in Newton, Massachusetts on June 12, 1892, the youngest of five children born to Robert Hallowell Gardiner III and Alice (Bangs) Gardiner. He studied at the Groton School, graduated from Harvard University in 1914, and studied for two years at Harvard Law School. He completed his studies with his brother Robert H. Gardiner, and was admitted to the bar in 1917.

== First World War ==
During the First World War, Gardiner served in the army. He later became the first lieutenant of the 1st Maine Heavy Artillery. He served outside the United States and participated in the operation that attained the Italian Armistice. After his military service, he established his law career in Portland, Maine.

== Politics ==
Gardiner was elected as a member of the Maine House of Representatives in 1920. He held that position for six years. In 1928, he was nominated by the Republican Party for the governorship of Maine. He won the general election by a popular vote. He was successful in his re-election bid in 1930. During his administration, when the stock market crashed, the crippling economic problems were dealt with. He left office on January 4, 1933.

During World War II Gardiner returned to the Army, serving in the United States Army Air Forces as a staff officer. While assigned as Intelligence Officer of the 51st Troop Carrier Wing in North Africa, he joined Brigadier General Maxwell D. Taylor, artillery commander of the 82nd Airborne Division, on a clandestine mission behind Axis lines in Italy on September 7–8, 1943. Meeting with Italian prime minister Marshal Pietro Badoglio and General Giacomo Carboni, the pair had been sent to assess the chances of success of an airborne operation to seize two airfields near Rome in advance of the Allied invasion of Italy at Salerno, and the credibility of Italian assurances of cooperation. As a result of the meeting, the proposed operation was cancelled at the last minute and a disaster averted.

== Personal life ==
Gardiner married Margaret Thomas and they had four children. Their son, Tudor (a lawyer), was married to Tenley Albright, a distinguished figure skater, and later a surgeon. He was an Episcopalian.

Gardiner was killed in a plane crash on August 3, 1953. He, along with state Senator Edward E. Chase and South Portland grocer Edwin S. Burt were flying home from a 56th Pioneer Infantry Association reunion in Shamokin, Pennsylvania when the Beechcraft Bonanza they were flying in exploded, crashing in Schnecksville, Pennsylvania. Gardiner was buried at Christ Church Cemetery in Gardiner, Maine.

== See also ==
- List of members of the American Legion

== Sources ==
- Sobel, Robert and John Raimo. Biographical Directory of the Governors of the United States, 1789–1978. Greenwood Press, 1988. ISBN 0-313-28093-2
- William Tudor Gardiner at National Governors Association

Party political offices
| Preceded by Owen Brewster | Republican nominee for Governor of Maine; 1928, 1930 | Succeeded by Burleigh Martin |
Political offices
| Preceded by Owen Brewster | Governor of Maine; 1929–1933 | Succeeded by Louis J. Brann |
