= Owen Brewster =

American politician (1888–1961)

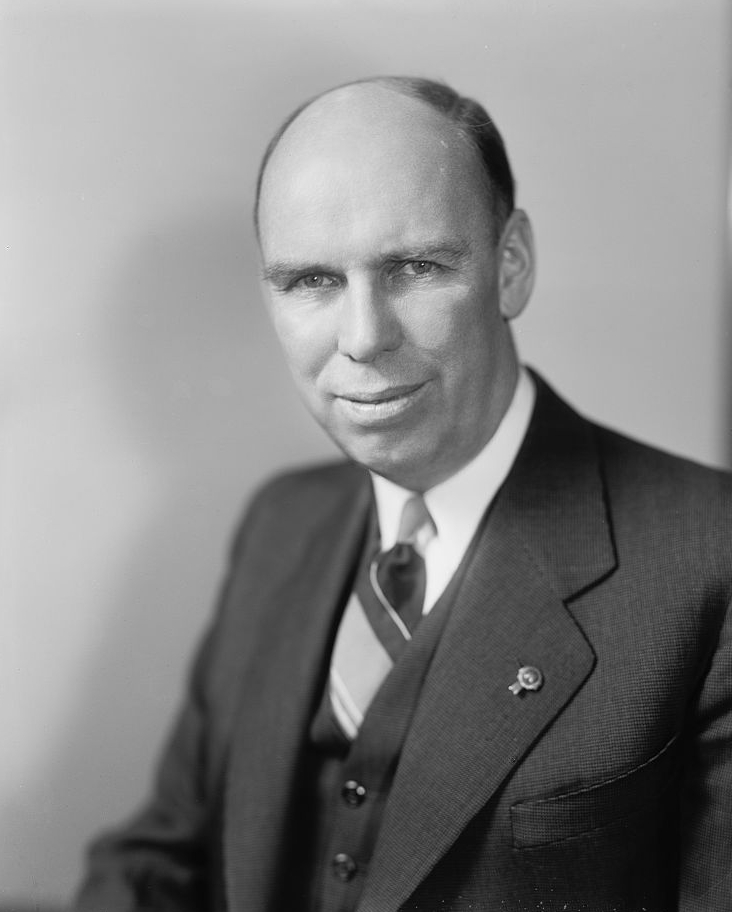

United States Senator from Maine
- In office January 3, 1941 – December 31, 1952
- Preceded by: Frederick Hale
- Succeeded by: Frederick G. Payne

Member of the U.S. House of Representatives from Maine's 3rd district
- In office January 3, 1935 – January 3, 1941
- Preceded by: John G. Utterback
- Succeeded by: Frank Fellows

Chair of the National Governors Association
- In office June 29, 1925 – July 25, 1927
- Preceded by: Elbert Lee Trinkle
- Succeeded by: Adam McMullen

54th Governor of Maine
- In office January 7, 1925 – January 2, 1929
- Preceded by: Percival P. Baxter
- Succeeded by: William Tudor Gardiner

Member of the Maine Senate from the 2nd district
- In office January 3, 1923 – January 7, 1925
- Constituency: Cumberland County

Member of the Maine House of Representatives from Portland
- In office January 5, 1921 – January 3, 1923
- In office 1917

Personal details
- Born: Ralph Owen Brewster; February 22, 1888 Dexter, Maine, U.S.
- Died: December 25, 1961 (aged 73) Brookline, Massachusetts, U.S.
- Party: Republican
- Education: Bowdoin College (BA); Harvard University (LLB)

Military service
- Allegiance: United States
- Branch/service: United States National Guard
- Rank: Captain
- Unit: Maine National Guard

Ralph Owen Brewster (Note: Known as Ralph O. Brewster until the early 1940s, and thereafter as Owen Brewster.) (February 22, 1888 – December 25, 1961) was an American politician from Maine. Brewster, a Republican, served as the 54th governor of Maine from 1925 to 1929, in the U.S. House of Representatives from 1935 to 1941 and in the U.S. Senate from 1941 to 1952. Brewster was a close confidant of Joseph McCarthy of Wisconsin and an antagonist of Howard Hughes. He was defeated by Frederick G. Payne, whose campaign was heavily funded by Hughes, in the 1952 Republican primary.

== Early years ==
Coat of arms of William Brewster

Ralph Owen Brewster was born in Dexter, Maine, the son of William E. Brewster, a banker, grocery store owner and member of the Maine House of Representatives, and Carrie S. Bridges. He was a direct lineal descendant of Love Brewster, a passenger aboard the Mayflower and a founder of the town of Bridgewater, Massachusetts; and of his father Elder William Brewster, the Pilgrim colonist leader and spiritual elder of the Plymouth Colony, and passenger aboard the Mayflower and one of the signers of the Mayflower Compact.

He graduated summa cum laude from Bowdoin College in 1909, a member of Phi Beta Kappa and Delta Kappa Epsilon. From 1909 to 1910, Brewster was the principal of Castine High School, and then attended Harvard Law School, graduating in 1913.

In 1915, he married Dorothy Foss, and from 1915 to 1923, he was a member of the Portland School Committee. From 1914 to 1925, Brewster was a lawyer for the Chapman and Brewster law firm in Portland. He also served as secretary of the Chamber of Commerce-affiliated "Committee of 100" which, in 1923, instituted a significant overhaul of Portland city government.

== Early political career ==
Brewster was elected to a two-year term as a member of the Maine House of Representatives in 1916, but resigned to enlist in the Third Infantry unit of the Maine National Guard when the nation entered World War I. He served successively as private, second lieutenant, captain, and regimental adjutant, and returned to the Maine House after the war ended. He continued to be a State House member from 1921 to 1922, when he was elected to the Maine Senate. Brewster served in the State Senate until 1925.

Brewster ran for Governor of Maine in 1924, and his Democratic opponent, William Robinson Pattangall, made Klan support for Brewster the centerpiece of his campaign. Although Brewster denied any involvement with the Ku Klux Klan, a number of Klan members openly supported him. Pattangall lost, but Brewster was also accused of Klan sympathies from within his own party, most notably by former Maine governor and fellow Republican Percival P. Baxter. Brewster's governorship would so split the Maine Republican Party that he denounced his own party's candidate in the U.S. Senate election in 1926. Republican Arthur R. Gould won anyway after running on an anti-Klan campaign, signaling the limits of the Klan's power in Maine politics.

Brewster challenged incumbent Senator Frederick Hale in the Republican primary in 1928 for that year's Senate race, losing to Hale.

== Contested election of 1932 ==
Brewster served two terms as governor, leaving office in 1929 after he lost the 1928 Republican nomination for U.S. Senate. In 1932, he was defeated for a seat in the U.S. House of Representatives, after a bitterly fought campaign against Democrat John G. Utterback from Bangor where Brewster also had a law office. Although Bangor was the largest city in Brewster's congressional district, his support came mainly from smaller towns. As one Maine newspaper put it in 1923, "the rank and file (of Republicans in Bangor) are decidedly, positively, and all-the-time anti-Brewster." Brewster accused Utterback and the Democratic Party of throwing the vote in certain predominantly Franco-American (i.e. Catholic-majority) towns in Aroostook County, and took that accusation first to state authorities and then to the U.S. Congress itself, where he tried to prevent Utterback from being seated. Although unsuccessful, Utterback was kept so much on the defensive that Brewster managed to defeat him in the 1934 election. Brewster served in the House until 1941, when he went on to the U.S. Senate. Brewster was re-elected to the Senate in 1946.

== Congressional career, opposition to New Deal, and post-war McCarthyism ==
During his time in Congress, Brewster worked on legislation to provide old-age pensions (the forerunner of Social Security) although he was a prominent opponent of welfare and spending programs in President Roosevelt's New Deal. As Senator, Brewster sat on several committees, notably the Special Senate Committee to Investigate the National Defense Program (the Truman Committee), and the Joint Committee to Investigate the attack on Pearl Harbor. At the time these were very high profile and Brewster's work on those committees did much to raise his profile in Washington.

Brewster played a role in defeating the signature New Deal project in his own district of Maine, a multibillion-dollar tidal power development planned for Passamaquoddy Bay. Supported by President Roosevelt, whose summer home on Campobello was within sight of the project area, Brewster initially seemed to be an ally. In 1935, however, he publicly accused a New Deal attorney, Thomas Corcoran, of threatening to kill the project unless Brewster favored the administration on a related vote reining in private utilities. Corcoran denied the charge in the public hearing that followed, Brewster shouting out "liar" at one point in the proceedings. While Brewster's accusation made it appear that he was still supportive, and that the Roosevelt administration was placing the development in jeopardy, the project's supporters believed he was playing a double game. In the town of Lubec, adjacent to the development site, a crowd of over 200 hung Brewster in effigy with a sign around his neck reading "our double-crossing Congressman."

The early support Brewster had received from the Ku Klux Klan cost him considerable support from within his own Republican party. In the post-war Senate, Brewster befriended Senator Joseph McCarthy of Wisconsin, and his association with McCarthyism further eroded Brewster's political support in Maine as McCarthy's anti-communist show-trials became increasingly unpopular. One of McCarthy's major opponents was another Republican member of Maine's congressional delegation, Margaret Chase Smith, whose late husband, Clyde H. Smith, had been a foe of Brewster and the Klan in the Maine Legislature of the 1920s.

== Opposition to Howard Hughes ==
Brewster came to national attention due to his opposition to the commercial interests of Howard Hughes, America's wealthiest person at the time. In 1947, Brewster was chairman of the special Senate committee investigating defense procurement during World War II. He claimed concern that Hughes had received $40 million from the War Department without actually delivering the aircraft he had contracted to provide, but Hughes countered that Brewster was motivated by his connections to Pan-American Airways, the rival to Hughes's Trans World Airlines.

Hughes aggressively combatted the inquiring Brewster, alleging that the senator was corrupt. Memoirs by Hughes's right-hand man Noah Dietrich and syndicated newspaper columnist Jack Anderson each sketched Brewster as, in Dietrich's words, "an errand boy for Juan Trippe and Pan American World Airways," who pushed for legislation that would give Pan Am the single-carrier international air monopoly for the U.S. The Martin Scorsese movie The Aviator portrays Brewster (played by Alan Alda) similarly, as corrupt and in the pocket of Pan Am, the rival of Hughes' TWA. Hughes spread rumors about Brewster's close association with Pan Am, alleging that he received free flights and hospitality in return for legislation such as his bill to withdraw government approval for TWA flights across the Atlantic.

In a Senate hearing that electrified the nation, Hughes repeated his accusations that Brewster had promised an end to the Senate inquiry if Hughes would agree to merging TWA with Pan Am. (Dietrich wrote that Hughes, in a bid to stall for time before the hearing, went so far as to launch negotiations with Trippe about such a merger.) In response, Brewster, stung by the allegations, stood aside from chairing the inquiry and became instead a witness before the committee – which also allowed Hughes to question Brewster directly. Brewster denied Hughes' allegations and made several counter-claims, but by the time the hearing ended Brewster's reputation had suffered greatly. Ironically, Hughes, for all his wealth, came across as what Dietrich described as the "little guy" who "fought City Hall and won." In order to placate Brewster's wishes, President Truman replaced James Landis, chairman of the Civil Aeronautics Board, who supported competition between Pan Am, American Overseas and Trans Word Airlines, and allowed Pan Am to buy American Overseas.

In 1952, Hughes worked hard to ensure Brewster's political demise, persuading the then-Governor of Maine, Frederick G. Payne, to challenge him in the Republican primary. Armed with $60,000 of campaign funds from Hughes, Payne challenged Brewster. Payne proceeded to connect Brewster with McCarthyism and racist groups and also took up Hughes' claims that Brewster was corrupt. This led to the unusual defeat of an incumbent Senator in his own primary. Brewster resigned his seat in December 1952 and was succeeded by Payne, who would only last one term, being defeated by Edmund Muskie in 1958.

== Retirement and later years ==
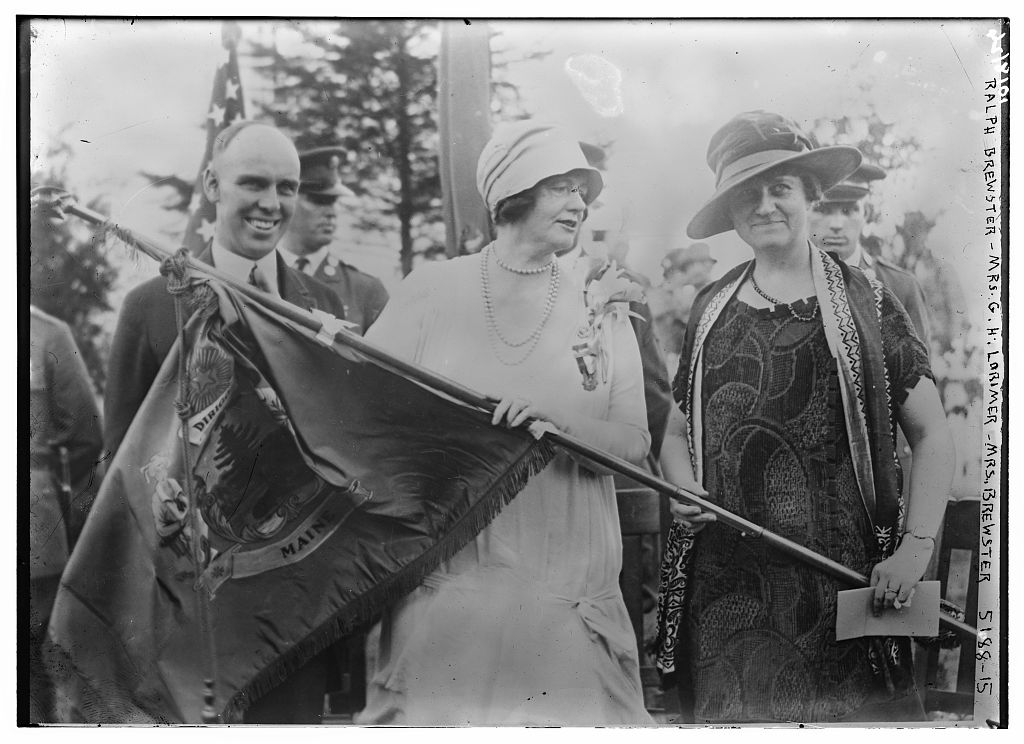
Owen Brewster and his wife, along with Mrs. G.H. Lorimer, holding a state flag of Maine.

In his retirement Brewster continued active involvement in many conservative organizations. Brewster was a Christian Scientist and served a one-year term in the largely honorary role as President of The First Church of Christ, Scientist in Boston for 1932–1933. He was a member of First Church of Christ, Scientist, Portland, Maine for many years, and later helped establish a Christian Science Society in Dexter, Maine. Brewster was a member of the American Bar Association, Grange, the American Legion, the Freemasons, the Elks, the Odd Fellows, and Delta Kappa Epsilon.

Brewster died unexpectedly of cancer on Christmas Day, 1961 in Brookline, Massachusetts. He was buried at Mount Pleasant Cemetery in Dexter, Maine where his home, which is listed on the National Register of Historic Places, was converted to the Brewster Inn, a bed and breakfast.

== Popular culture ==
In 2004, Brewster was portrayed by Alan Alda in The Aviator. Alda was nominated for the Academy Award for Best Supporting Actor for his performance, but lost to Morgan Freeman for Million Dollar Baby.

== Notes ==
Party political offices
Preceded by Percival P. Baxter	Republican nominee for Governor of Maine; 1924, 1926	Succeeded by William Tudor Gardiner
Preceded by Frederick Hale	Republican nominee for U.S. Senator from Maine (Class 1); 1940, 1946	Succeeded by Frederick G. Payne
Preceded by Styles Bridges	Chair of the National Republican Senatorial Committee; 1951–1952	Succeeded by Everett Dirksen
Political offices
Preceded by Percival P. Baxter	Governor of Maine; 1925–1929	Succeeded by William Tudor Gardiner
Preceded by Elbert Lee Trinkle	Chair of the National Governors Association; 1925–1927	Succeeded by Adam McMullen
U.S. House of Representatives
Preceded by John G. Utterback	Member of the U.S. House of Representatives from Maine's 3rd congressional district 1935–1941	Succeeded by Frank Fellows
U.S. Senate
Preceded by Frederick Hale	United States Senator (Class 1) from Maine; 1941–1952; Served alongside: Wallace H. White, Margaret Chase Smith	Succeeded by Frederick G. Payne
Preceded by James M. Mead	Chair of the Senate National Defense Program Committee; 1947–1948	Position abolished
