= St. Luke's Church (Baltimore) =

Historic church in Maryland, United States

- U.S. National Register of Historic Places
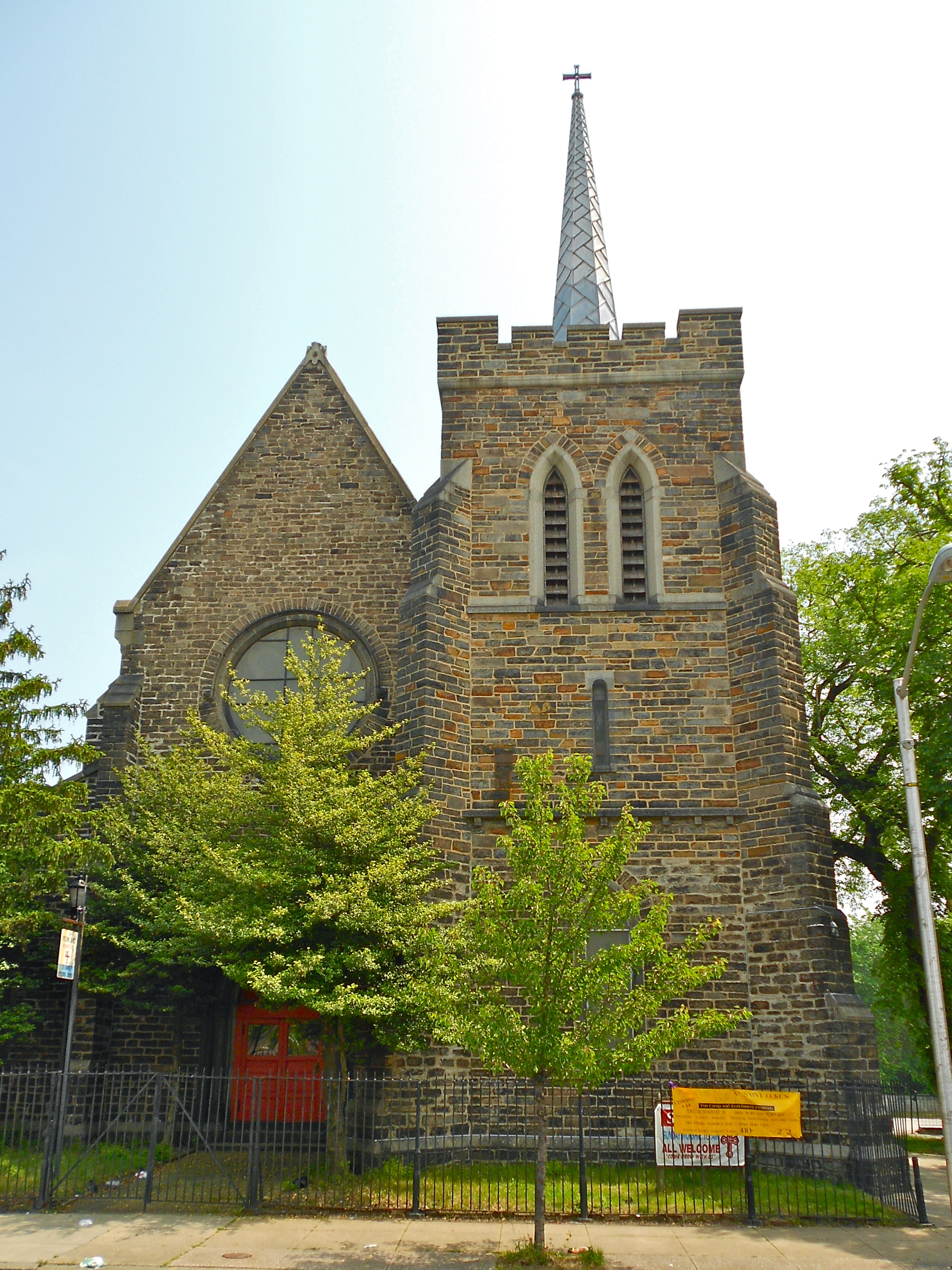
- St. Luke's Church, May 2012

- Location within Baltimore Location within Maryland Location within the United States
- Location: 217 N. Carey St., Baltimore, Maryland
- Coordinates: 39°17′28″N 76°38′18″W
- Area: 7 acres (2.8 ha)
- Built: 1851
- Architect: Priest, J.W.; Et al.
- Architectural style: Gothic Revival
- NRHP reference No.: 73002196
- Added to NRHP: March 30, 1973

St. Luke's Church, is a historic Episcopal church located in Baltimore, Maryland, United States. It is a Gothic Revival-style church that follows the dictates of the Ecclesiological Society reflecting English medieval building principles. It is composed of a tall nave, flanked by side aisles below a clerestory, and features a crenelated tower with lancet windows. Rose windows exist at the west end of the nave and along the clerestory. It was the largest Episcopal church in Baltimore upon its completion in 1851. The church reported 38 members in 2015 and 15 members in 2020; no membership statistics were reported in 2024 parochial reports. Plate and pledge income reported for the congregation in 2024 was $0.00 with average Sunday attendance (ASA) of zero persons.

St. Luke's Church was listed on the National Register of Historic Places in 1973.

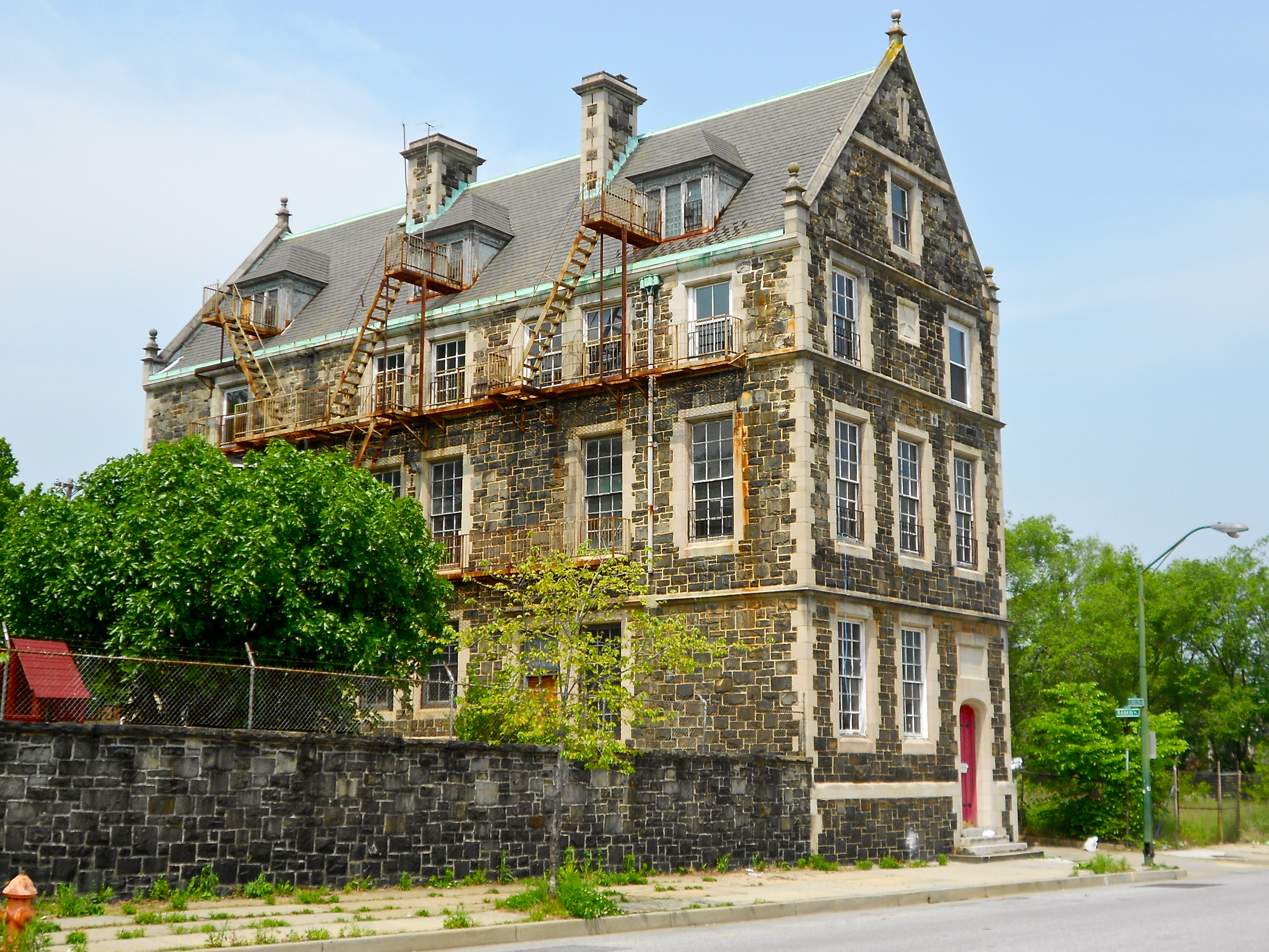
St. Luke's Clergy House
