= Edward C. Moran Jr. =

American politician (1894–1967)

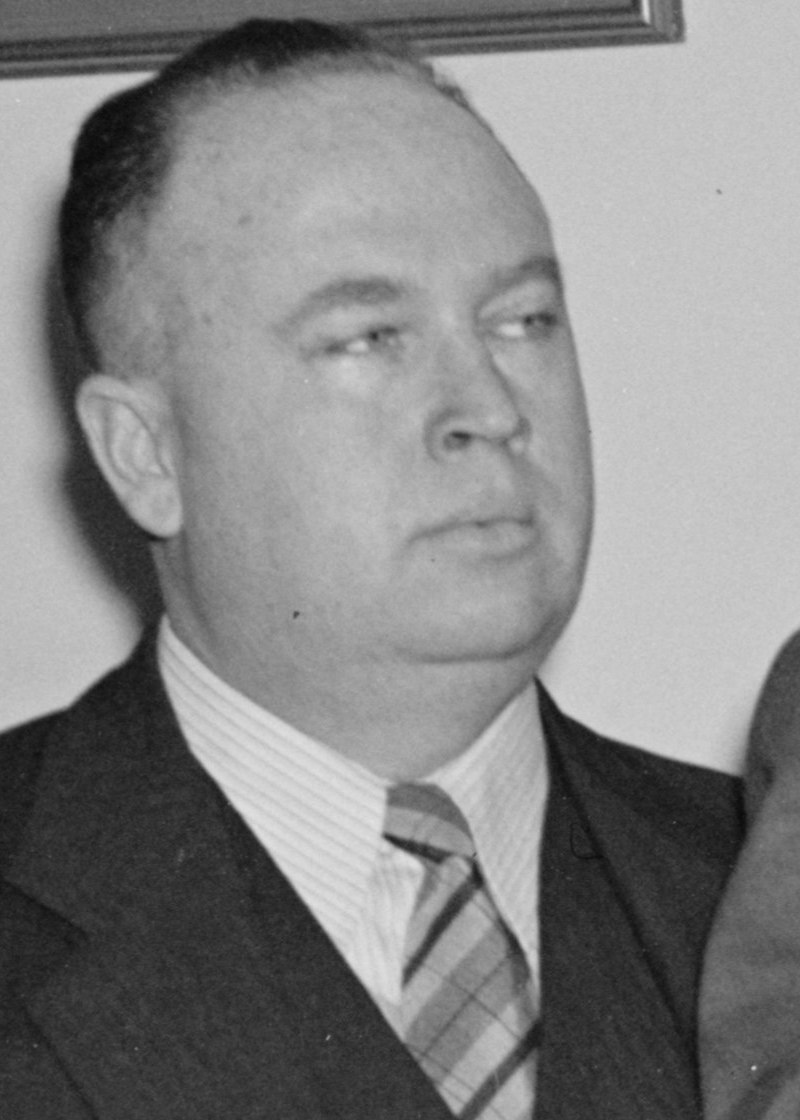
Edward C. Moran Jr. in 1937

Edward Carleton Moran Jr. (December 29, 1894 – July 12, 1967) was an American politician from Maine who served in the United States House of Representatives.

== Biography ==
Born in Rockland, Maine, he graduated from Bowdoin College in 1917. At Bowdoin, he majored in history and government, and captained the debate team for two years.

Moran was a veteran of World War I, and served as a second lieutenant in Battery A, 73rd Artillery Regiment, a unit of the Coast Artillery Corps. He later served at the Fort Monroe Coast Artillery Training Center and was a first lieutenant when he was discharged at the end of the war. He was a member and past commander of Winslow-Holbrook-Merritt Post, American Legion, in Rockland.

Moran was in the insurance business from 1919 until 1967 as a member of the family-owned E. C. Moran Company. The insurance agency was started by his father, Edward C. Moran Sr., and is still in business in Rockland.

A Democrat, Moran was a delegate to the state party conventions every two years from 1922 to 1936, and to the Democratic National Conventions in 1924 and 1932. He was chairman of the Maine Democratic State Committee from 1928 to 1930. He ran unsuccessfully for Governor of Maine in 1928 and 1930.

In 1932 Moran was elected to the U.S. House and he served two terms, 1933 to 1937. He did not run for reelection in 1936.

Moran was a member of the United States Maritime Commission from 1937 to 1940. In 1942 he served as the Maine director of the federal Office of Price Administration. In 1945 he served as an Assistant Secretary of Labor. After World War II, Moran sought to reform Rockland's government, and wrote Rockland's Charter and Ordinances. In 1946 and 1947, Moran was chairman of the Rockland City Council.

== Death ==
Moran died in Rockland on July 12, 1967, leaving a widow, Mrs. Irene Gusbee Moran, a son, Paul W. Moran, and two grandchildren. His funeral service was at Rockland Congregational Church, and he was interred in Achorn Cemetery in Rockland.

Upon Moran's death, U. S. Senator Edmund Muskie made this statement in the Congressional Record:

"...What I admired most about Carl Moran was his courage in being an active Democrat in Maine at a time when the party could hope for few victories at the polls. His successes in the public interest were highly significant in the development of Maine as a two-party State. Maine people of every political persuasion have benefited from the revival of political competition, which he helped ignite."

Party political offices
Preceded by Ernest L. McLean	Democratic nominee for Governor of Maine; 1928, 1930	Succeeded by Louis J. Brann
U.S. House of Representatives
Preceded by Donald B. Partridge	Member of the U.S. House of Representatives from Maine's 2nd congressional district March 4, 1933 – January 3, 1937	Succeeded by Clyde H. Smith
