= Maryland Route 381 =

State highway in Maryland, United States

Maryland Route 381
- Brandywine Road
- Maryland Route 381 highlighted in red

Route information
- Maintained by MDSHA
- Length: 15.91 mi (25.60 km)
- Existed: 1927–present
- Tourist routes: Star-Spangled Banner Scenic Byway

Major junctions
- South end: MD 231 at Patuxent
- MD 382 near Aquasco
- North end: US 301 in Brandywine

Location
- Country: United States
- State: Maryland
- Counties: Charles, Prince George's

Highway system
- Maryland highway system; Interstate; US; State; Scenic Byways
← MD 380	→ MD 382

Maryland Route 381 (MD 381) is a state highway in the U.S. state of Maryland. Known as Brandywine Road, the highway runs 15.91 miles (25.60 km) from MD 231 at Patuxent north to U.S. Route 301 (US 301) in Brandywine. MD 381 connects Brandywine with the southeastern corner of Prince George's County and the northeastern corner of Charles County. The highway was constructed from MD 5 through Brandywine in the 1910s. MD 381 was extended southeast to MD 231 in the late 1920s and early 1930s. When MD 5 was relocated between Camp Springs and Brandywine in the mid-1950s, MD 381 was extended north along the old road to Camp Springs. The highway was rolled back to its present terminus at US 301 in the mid-1960s. The route can serve as an alternate route to the more heavily traveled MD 5 for those wanting to go from St. Mary's, Calvert, and eastern Charles counties to Brandywine.

== Route description ==
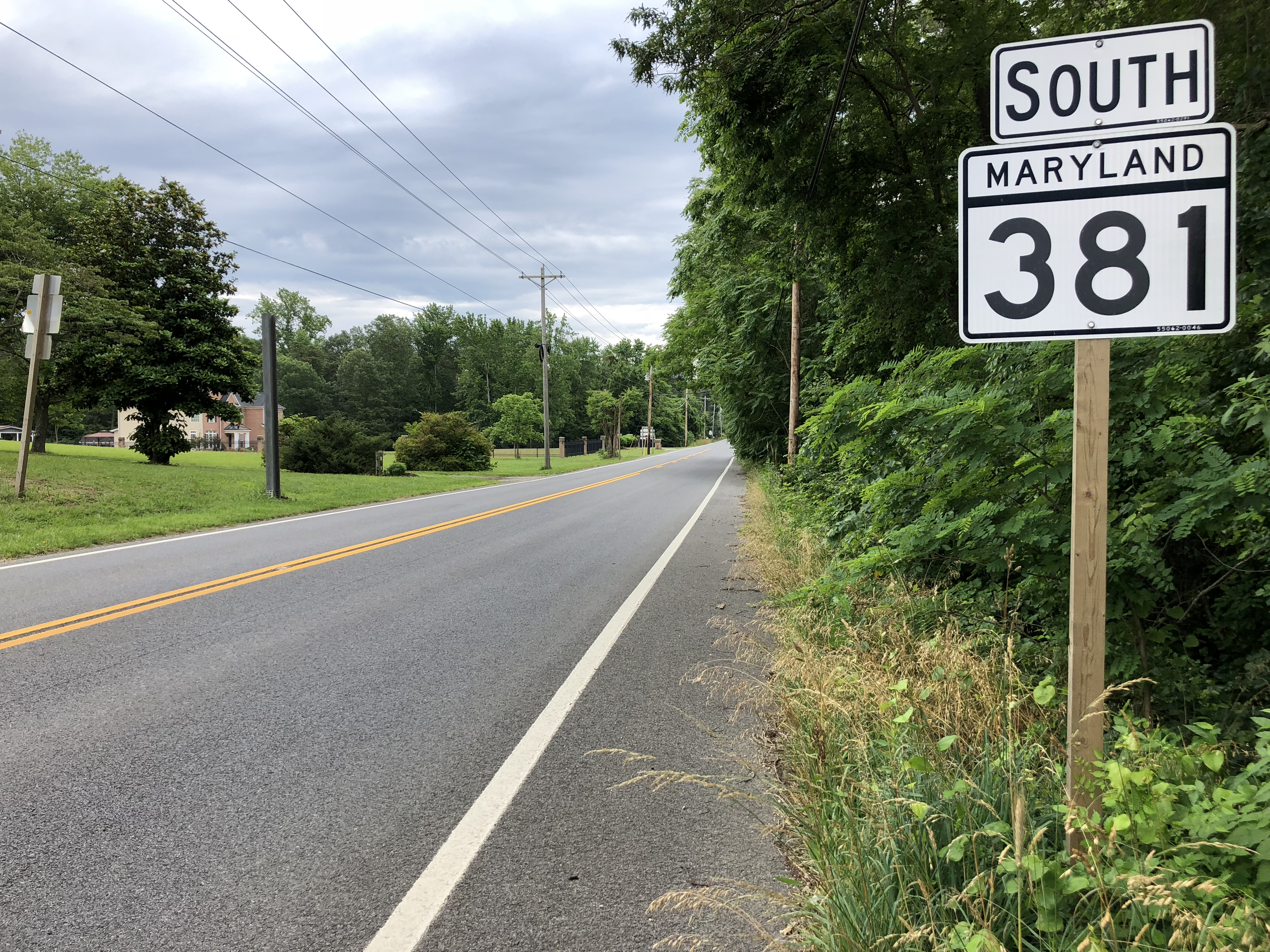
View south along MD 381 at MD 382 near Aquasco

MD 381 begins at an intersection with MD 231 (Prince Frederick Road) at the hamlet of Patuxent between Hughesville and the Patuxent River. The highway heads north as a two-lane undivided road to the Charles–Prince George's county line at Swanson Creek. Just north of Swanson Creek, MD 381 crosses the Herbert Subdivision of CSX's Pope's Creek Subdivision railroad line, which connects the Pope's Creek Subdivision with the Chalk Point Generating Station to the east. Road access to the power plant is provided by Eagle Harbor Road, which also serves the tiny town of Eagle Harbor. MD 381 continues through the village of Aquasco, which contains the historic homes Sunnyside and Villa DeSales and St. Mary's Rectory. The highway gradually curves northwest and meets MD 382 (Croom Road) at Poplar Hill. MD 381 passes through the village of Baden, which contains St. Paul's Parish Church, and to the east of Cedarville, which sits north of Cedarville State Forest.

MD 381 completes its westward curve before entering the village of Brandywine. MD 381 has a pair of at-grade railroad crosses at two of the three corners of the wye junction of the Herbert Subdivision and the Pope's Creek Subdivision. West of the latter railroad, the highway passes the historic William W. Early House. MD 381 veers northwest just before reaching its northern terminus at US 301 (Robert Crain Highway) adjacent to Gwynn Park High School and northeast of US 301's partial interchange with MD 5 (Branch Avenue). Brandywine Road continues as a county highway northwest through the hamlet of T.B., where the highway meets the eastern end of MD 373 (Accokeek Road), the northern end of short, unsigned MD 631 (Old Brandywine Road), and intersects MD 5. Brandywine Road serves the missing movements of the US 301–MD 5 interchange, allowing access from southbound MD 5 to northbound US 301 and from southbound US 301 to northbound MD 5.

== History ==
The first section of Brandywine Road to be improved was from the Pope's Creek Branch railroad crossing east to North Keys Road, which was built by Prince George's County with state aid as a 14-foot (4.3 m) gravel road in 1911. By 1921, a segment of gravel road connected the Brandywine section with the Southern Maryland Road in the hamlet of T.B. at what is today the intersection of Brandywine Road and Old Brandywine Road east of MD 5. Construction on the remainder of MD 381 began in 1929 with the construction of three sections of gravel road between Brandywine to Aquasco. All three segments were completed by the end of 1930. MD 381 was completed as a gravel road from Aquasco to its southern terminus at Patuxent in 1933. When MD 5 was relocated to its present alignment from its junction with US 301 north to north of Camp Springs in 1956, MD 381 was extended north along MD 5's old alignment on Brandywine Road and Old Branch Avenue through Clinton and Camp Springs. The portion of the state highway north of US 301 was transferred to county maintenance in 1965.

== Junction list ==
County	Location	mi	km	Destinations	Notes
Charles	Patuxent	0.00	0.00	MD 231 (Prince Frederick Road) – Hughesville, Prince Frederick	Southern terminus
Prince George's		6.56	10.56	MD 382 (Croom Road) – Upper Marlboro	
Prince George's	Brandywine	15.91	25.60	US 301 (Crain Highway) / Brandywine Road north to MD 5 / MD 373 – La Plata, Upper Marlboro, Washington	Northern terminus
1.000 mi = 1.609 km; 1.000 km = 0.621 mi
