= Maryland Route 382 =

State highway in Maryland, United States

Maryland Route 382
- Croom Road
- Maryland Route 382 highlighted in red

Route information
- Maintained by MDSHA
- Length: 15.34 mi (24.69 km)
- Existed: 1927–present
- Tourist routes: Star-Spangled Banner Scenic Byway

Major junctions
- South end: Covington Road at the Charles County line near Aquasco
- MD 381 near Aquasco
- North end: US 301 in Marlton

Location
- Country: United States
- State: Maryland
- Counties: Prince George's, Charles

Highway system
- Maryland highway system; Interstate; US; State; Scenic Byways
← MD 381	→ MD 383

Maryland Route 382 (MD 382) is a state highway in the U.S. state of Maryland. Known as Croom Road, the highway runs 15.34 miles (24.69 km) from the Charles–Prince George's county line near Aquasco north to U.S. Route 301 (US 301) in Marlton. MD 382 connects Upper Marlboro with the southeastern corner of Prince George's County and northeastern Charles County. The highway formerly extended west from its southern terminus to Waldorf. MD 382 was built from what is now US 301 south through Croom between the mid-1920s and early 1930s. The highway was extended south and west through Charles County to near Waldorf in the mid-1950s. Part of the extension has been built in the late 1920s as part of MD 233, a parallel highway that extended east to the county line near Aquasco. MD 382 was truncated at the county line to achieve its present length in the late 1980s.

== Route description ==
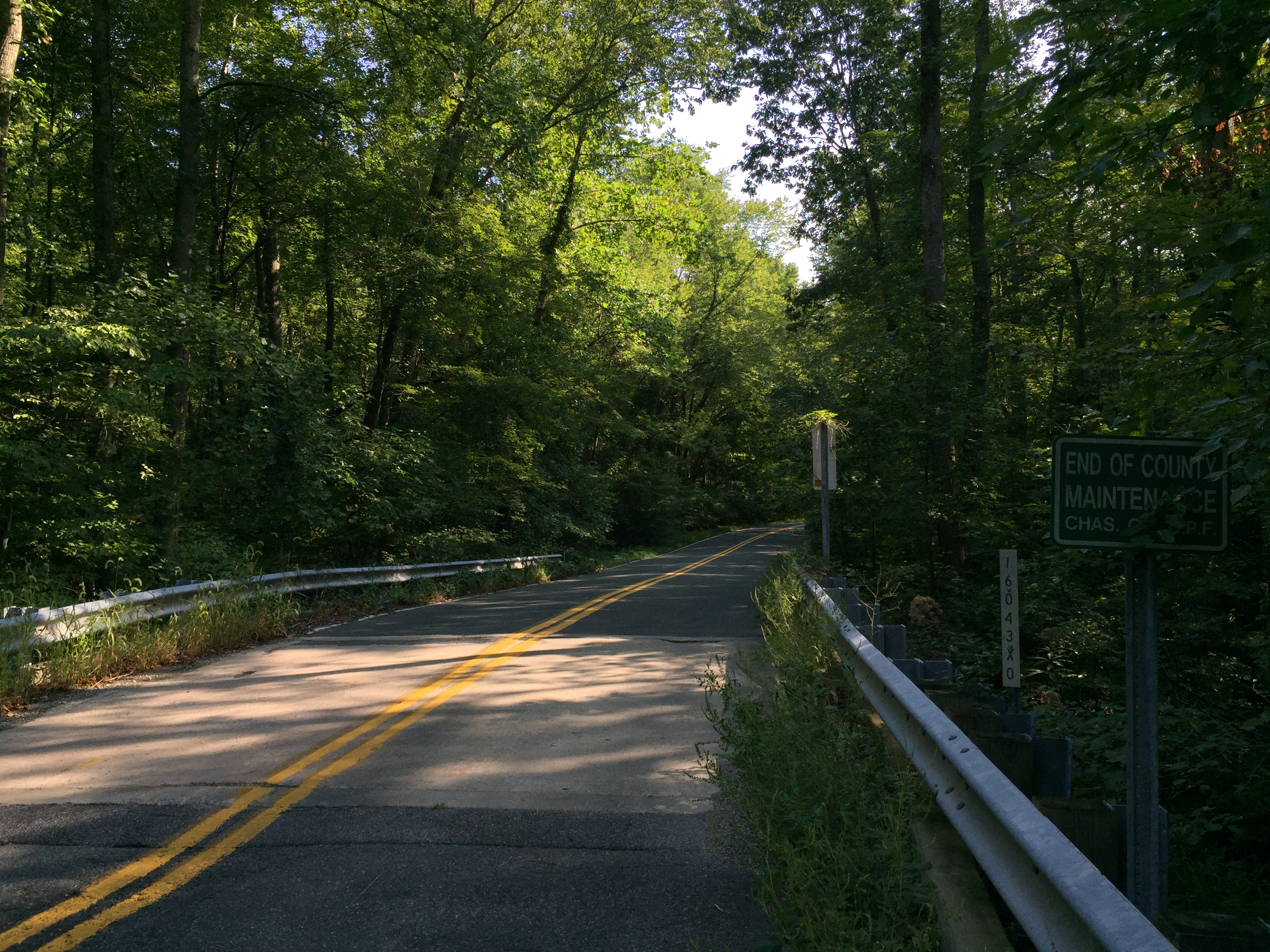
View north at the south end of MD 382 at the Charles County line near Aquasco

MD 382 begins at a bridge across County Line Creek, which forms the border between Charles and Prince George's counties. The road continues west into Charles County as Covington Road and then Poplar Hill Road past the Dr. Samuel A. Mudd House to Waldorf. MD 382 heads northeast as an 18-foot-wide (5.5 m) two-lane undivided road and intersects MD 381 (Brandywine Road) at the hamlet of Poplar Hill north of Aquasco, where the highway expands to 24 feet (7.3 m) in width. The highway continues north parallel to the Patuxent River and crosses Black Swamp Creek, Full Mill Branch, and Rock Creek. The highway passes several units of Patuxent River Park, which encompasses some of the bottomlands along the river. MD 382 veers away from the river and passes the historic home Brookefield of the Berrys in the hamlet of Naylor. The highway crosses across Mataponi Creek, which flows into the Patuxent River between another unit of the Patuxent River Park and the Merkle Natural Resources Management Area.

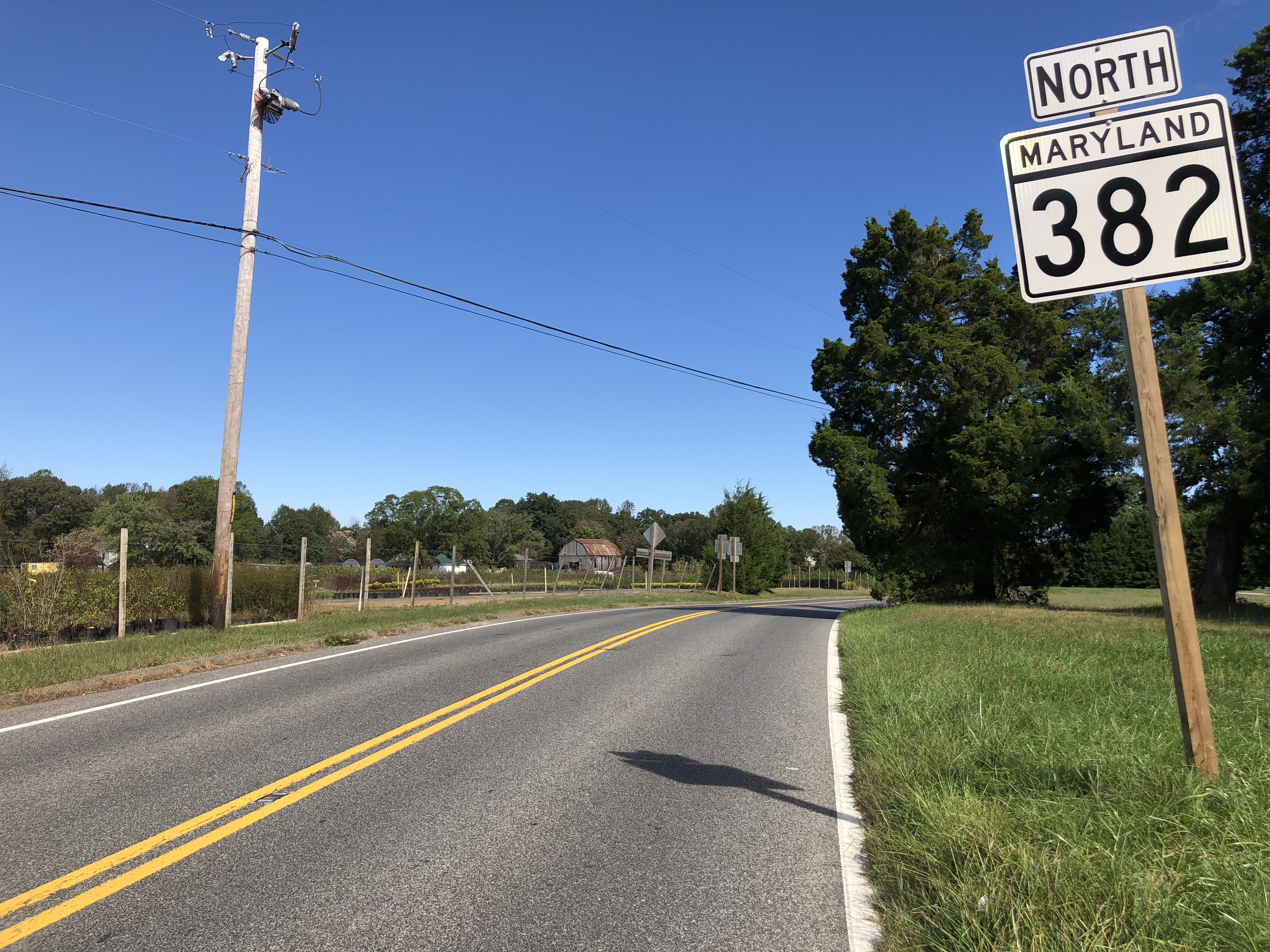
View north along MD 382 at MD 381 near Aquasco

MD 382 continues through the village of Croom, where it passes by St. Thomas' Church and the John W. Coffren House and Store and to the east of the historic manor house at Bellefields. The state highway continues to the west of the historic home Waverly and Mount Calvert Historical and Archaeological Park. MD 382 veers northwest and intersects CSX's Pope's Creek Subdivision railroad line at-grade and crosses swampy Charles Branch as it runs along the edge of the suburban residential development of Marlton. The highway passes Frederick Douglass High School before reaching its northern terminus at US 301 (Robert Crain Highway).

== History ==
In addition to the existing section of MD 382 in Prince George's County, there was a continuation of the state highway in Charles County west to near Waldorf. The Croom Road portion of the highway was started in 1924 from MD 3 (now US 301) and completed beyond the Pope's Creek Branch of the Pennsylvania Railroad to near Mount Calvert Road in 1924 and 1925. MD 382 was extended south to about Croom Airport Road north of Croom in 1926 and 1927. The extension of the highway south to Candy Hill Road at Naylor was started in 1930. MD 382 was completed to just south of Rock Creek in 1932. Part of the Charles County segment of MD 382 was constructed as MD 233. MD 233 was built from Beantown southeast of Waldorf at the modern intersection of MD 5 and MD 5 Business east along Poplar Hill Road to a point west of Zekiah Swamp in 1926 and 1927. The highway was extended east to Dr. Samuel Mudd Road, then continued along that road to Bryantown Road, which became MD 232, in 1928. MD 233 construction continued along Woodville Road, paralleling Poplar Hill Road to the south. The highway was completed to the Washington, Brandywine and Point Lookout Railroad (now the Herbert Subdivision of the Pope's Creek Subdivision) at Gallant Green in 1929. MD 233 was extended to County Line Creek in two sections between 1930 and 1933.

MD 382 was extended south from Rock Creek to MD 381 in 1955. In 1956, the state highway was extended west from MD 381 to County Line Creek and west along Covington Road and Poplar Hill Road to MD 5 at Beantown. MD 382 took over the portion of MD 233 from Dr. Samuel Mudd Road to Beantown, Dr. Samuel Mudd Road became a northward extension of MD 232, and the Woodville Road portion of MD 233 was transferred to Charles County. The portion of MD 382 in Charles County except from MD 5 to Mattawoman–Beantown Road was transferred to county maintenance in 1989. That segment at the western end became the southern end of MD 205, which was assigned at the same time along Mattawoman-Beantown Road north to US 301. The southern end of MD 205 was relocated and reconstructed as a divided highway as MD 5's new bypass of Waldorf in 1997. A bypassed portion of Poplar Hill Road at the old intersection between Poplar Hill Road and Mattawoman–Beantown Road became MD 382F by 1999.

== Junction list ==
The entire route is in Prince George's County.

Location	mi	km	Destinations	Notes
	0.00	0.00	Covington Road west	Charles County line; southern terminus
	0.65	1.05	MD 381 (Brandywine Road) – Brandywine, Aquasco	
Marlton	15.34	24.69	US 301 (Crain Highway) – Upper Marlboro, Waldorf	Northern terminus
1.000 mi = 1.609 km; 1.000 km = 0.621 mi

== Auxiliary routes ==
There are two auxiliary routes of MD 382 located near Waldorf in Charles County.

- MD 382F is the designation for an unnamed 0.11-mile (0.18 km) section of old alignment of MD 382 and Poplar Hill Road adjacent to that road's intersection with MD 5 (Mattawoman–Beantown Road).
- MD 382G is the designation for an unnamed 0.02-mile (0.032 km) connecting spur between Poplar Hill Road and MD 382F. MD 382G was assigned to the spur in 2010.
