= Sasscer =

Sasscer is a surname, and may refer to:

- Frederick Sasscer, Jr., attorney, journalist and educator from Upper Marlboro, Maryland
- Lansdale Ghiselin Sasscer, represented the fifth district of the state of Maryland in the United States House of Representatives for seven terms 1939–1953
- Lansdale Ghiselin Sasscer, Jr., member of the Maryland House of Delegates, first elected in 1954

== See also ==
- Digges-Sasscer house, an historic building in Upper Marlboro, Maryland
- Sasscer Tobacco Barn, an historic building in Brandywine, Maryland
