= Maryland Route 373 =

State highway in Maryland, United States

Maryland Route 373
- Maryland Route 373 highlighted in red

Route information
- Maintained by MDSHA
- Length: 8.16 mi (13.13 km)
- Existed: 1955–present

Major junctions
- West end: MD 210 in Accokeek
- MD 5 in Brandywine
- East end: Brandywine Road in Brandywine

Location
- Country: United States
- State: Maryland
- Counties: Prince George's

Highway system
- Maryland highway system; Interstate; US; State; Scenic Byways
← MD 372	→ MD 374

Maryland Route 373 (MD 373) is a state highway in the U.S. state of Maryland. Known as Accokeek Road, the highway runs 8.16 miles (13.13 km) from MD 210 in Accokeek east to Brandywine Road just east of MD 5 in Brandywine. Except for its westernmost segment that was built around 1930 as part of MD 224, MD 373 was designated and improved as a modern highway in the mid-1950s.

== Route description ==
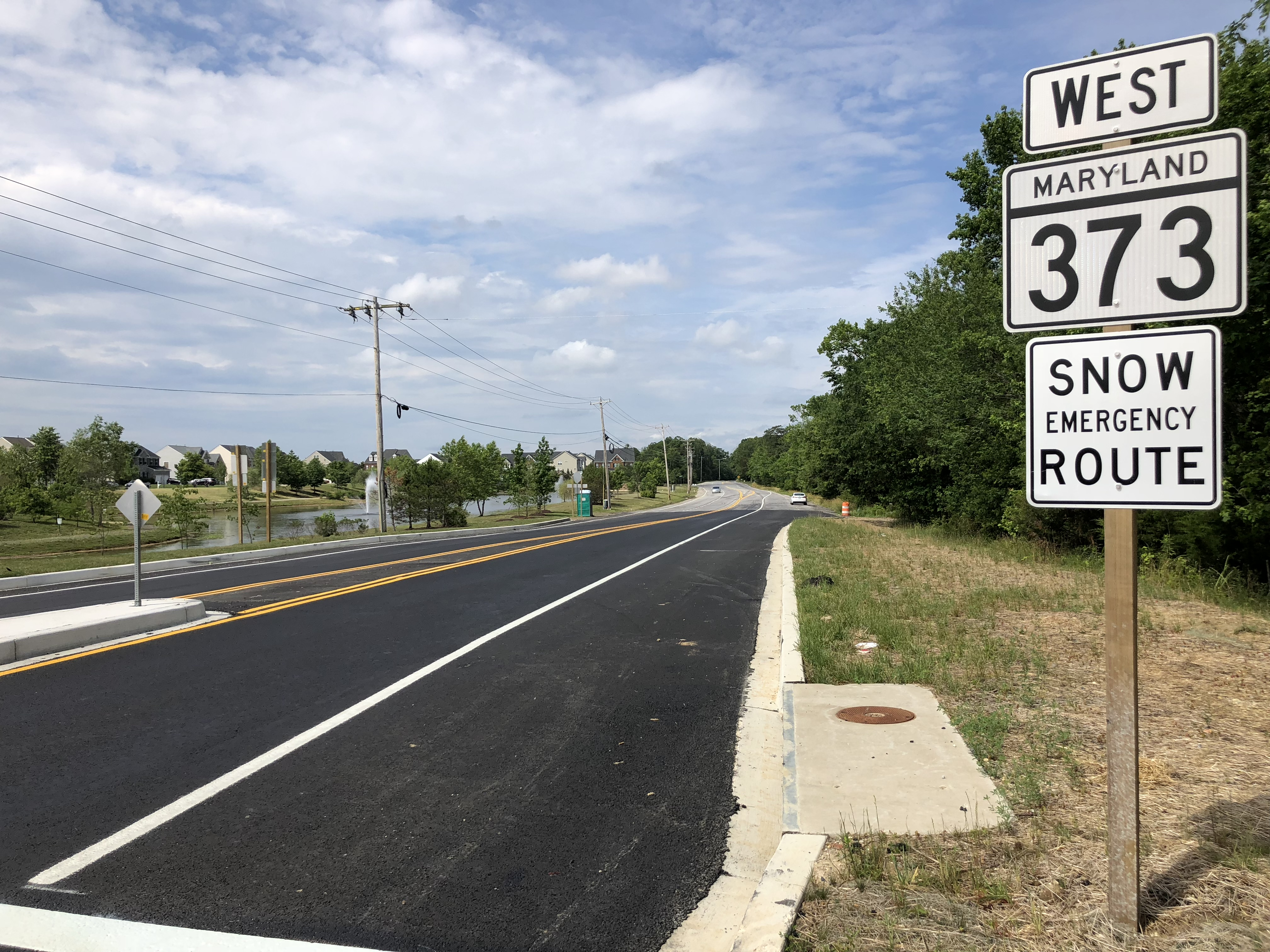
View west at the east end of MD 373 at MD 5 in Brandywine

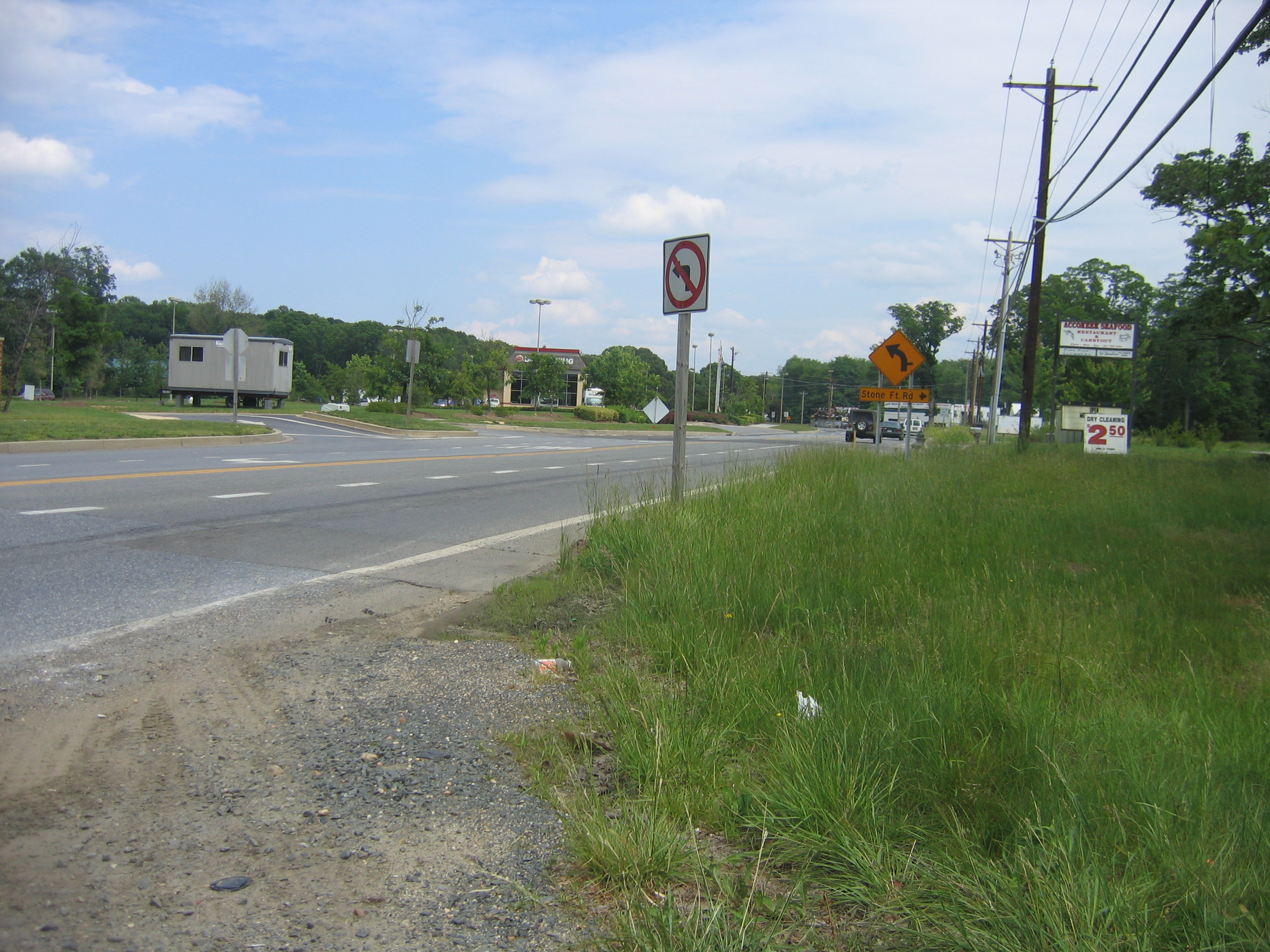
MD 373 eastbound past its western terminus at MD 210 in Accokeek

MD 373 begins as Livingston Road at an intersection with MD 210 (Indian Head Highway) in Accokeek. Livingston Road continues west as unsigned MD 810J a short distance before becoming a county highway. MD 373 heads east as a two-lane undivided road, passing south of a park and ride lot serving MTA Maryland commuter buses, and continues straight on Accokeek Road when Livingston Road curves north. The highway turns north at its three-way intersection with Bealle Hill Road and turns east again at its second T junction with Bealle Hill Road. MD 373 continues east through the hamlet of Danville and curves around Lake Ruth, an impoundment of Burch Branch of Piscataway Creek. The highway intersects MD 5 (Branch Avenue) just west of its eastern terminus at a T intersection with county-maintained Brandywine Road in the hamlet of T.B. west of the center of Brandywine. This junction is just west of Brandywine Road's junction with unsigned MD 631 (Old Brandywine Road). Brandywine Road becomes a state highway, MD 381, at its intersection with U.S. Route 301 (Robert Crain Highway) to the east.

== History ==
The portion of MD 373 that follows Livingston Road was originally part of MD 224, which followed Livingston Road from Mason Springs in Charles County north to Washington. That segment was constructed as a gravel road in 1929 and 1930. The Accokeek–Brandywine county highway was improved as a gravel road from MD 224 to Danville Road by 1950; the section from there to MD 5 remained a graded dirt road. In 1955, MD 373 was assigned to the highway from MD 5 west to Livingston Road—which was stripped of its MD 224 designation and transferred to county maintenance the same year—and then along Livingston Road to MD 210. The whole highway was also paved that year. MD 373 originally had its eastern terminus at Brandywine Road's intersection with MD 631. MD 373's terminus was relocated to its present T intersection with Brandywine Road in 2011 as part of the first phase of the project to construct an interchange between MD 5 and Brandywine Road and MD 373.

== Junction list ==
The entire route is in Prince George's County.

Location	mi	km	Destinations	Notes
Accokeek	0.00	0.00	MD 210 (Indian Head Highway) / Livingston Road south – Indian Head, Washington	Western terminus; Livingston Road west of the intersection is MD 810J
Brandywine	8.09	13.02	MD 5 (Branch Avenue) to US 301 south – Waldorf, Washington	
Brandywine	8.16	13.13	Brandywine Road to US 301 north / MD 381 – Upper Marlboro	Eastern terminus
1.000 mi = 1.609 km; 1.000 km = 0.621 mi
