= Citizens Bank of Maryland =

Bank headquartered in Laurel, Maryland, US

- Industry: Banking
- Founded: November 20, 1928
- Defunct: March 14, 1997
- Fate: Acquired by Crestar Bank
- Headquarters: Laurel, Maryland
- Total assets: $3.842 billion (1996)

Citizens Bank of Maryland was a bank headquartered in Laurel, Maryland. In 1997, it was acquired by Crestar Bank, which was in turn acquired by SunTrust Banks (later Truist Financial) in 2000. At the time of its acquisition by Crestar, the bank had 103 branches, most of which were in the Washington metropolitan area. It was the largest bank in Prince George's County, Maryland.

== History ==
The bank was established on November 20, 1928.

In 1982, the bank acquired Bank of Brandywine.

On March 14, 1997, the bank was acquired by Crestar Bank for $774 million in stock.
