= Baden, Maryland =

- Census-designated place
- Baden in the 1960s
- Location in Maryland Baden, Maryland (the United States)
- Coordinates: 38°39′33″N 76°46′27″W
- Country: United States
- State: Maryland
- County: Prince George's
- Named for: Baden, Germany

Area
  - Total: 28.53 sq mi (73.89 km^{2})
  - Land: 27.60 sq mi (71.49 km^{2})
  - Water: 0.93 sq mi (2.40 km^{2})

Population (2020)
  - Total: 2,114
  - Density: 76.6/sq mi (29.57/km^{2})
- Time zone: UTC−5 (Eastern (EST))
  - Summer (DST): UTC−4 (EDT)
- FIPS code: 24-03500
- GNIS feature ID: 597035

Baden is an unincorporated area and census-designated place in southeastern Prince George's County, Maryland, United States. As of the 2020 census, the CDP had a population of 2,114.

== Geography ==
As of the 2010 census, the CDP had a total area of 28.5 square miles (73.9 km^{2}), of which 27.7 square miles (71.7 km^{2}) was land and 0.85 square miles (2.2 km^{2}), or 10.55%, was water, consisting primarily of the Patuxent River, which forms the eastern boundary of the CDP, separating it from Calvert County. It's 35 kilometres (22 mi) southeast of Washington, D.C.

Baden is bordered to the south by Aquasco, to the southwest by Charles County, to the west by Cedarville, to the north by Croom, and to the east by Brandywine.

== Demographics ==
Historical population
Census	Pop.	Note	%±
2010	2,128		—
2020	2,114		−0.7%
U.S. Decennial Census; 2010 2020

Baden first appeared as a census designated place in the 2010 U.S. census.

=== Racial and ethnic composition ===
Baden CDP, Maryland – Racial and ethnic composition Note: the US Census treats Hispanic/Latino as an ethnic category. This table excludes Latinos from the racial categories and assigns them to a separate category. Hispanics/Latinos may be of any race.
Race / Ethnicity (NH = Non-Hispanic)	Pop 2010	Pop 2020	% 2010	% 2020
White alone (NH)	1,232	1,029	57.89%	48.68%
Black or African American alone (NH)	726	721	34.12%	34.11%
Native American or Alaska Native alone (NH)	21	8	0.99%	0.38%
Asian alone (NH)	13	22	0.61%	1.04%
Native Hawaiian or Pacific Islander alone (NH)	0	1	0.00%	0.05%
Other race alone (NH)	2	6	0.09%	0.28%
Mixed race or Multiracial (NH)	84	146	3.95%	6.91%
Hispanic or Latino (any race)	50	181	2.35%	8.56%
Total	2,128	2,114	100.00%	100.00%

=== 2020 census ===
As of the 2020 census, Baden had a population of 2,114. The median age was 49.0 years. 17.1% of residents were under the age of 18 and 20.6% of residents were 65 years of age or older. For every 100 females there were 107.9 males, and for every 100 females age 18 and over there were 104.2 males age 18 and over.

0.0% of residents lived in urban areas, while 100.0% lived in rural areas.

There were 790 households in Baden, of which 28.0% had children under the age of 18 living in them. Of all households, 58.6% were married-couple households, 19.6% were households with a male householder and no spouse or partner present, and 16.6% were households with a female householder and no spouse or partner present. About 22.2% of all households were made up of individuals and 10.6% had someone living alone who was 65 years of age or older.

There were 838 housing units, of which 5.7% were vacant. The homeowner vacancy rate was 0.6% and the rental vacancy rate was 0.0%.

== Education ==
Baden residents are assigned to schools in Prince George's County Public Schools. Residential areas of the CDP area are zoned to Baden Elementary School, Gwynn Park Middle School, and Gwynn Park High School.

Prince George's County Memorial Library System operates the Baden Library.

== Notable people ==
- Alethia Tanner grew up on the plantation of Rachel Pratt, the mother of Maryland governor Thomas Pratt on the west side of the Patuxent River opposite Lower Marlboro.
