= Aquasco, Maryland =

- Census-designated place
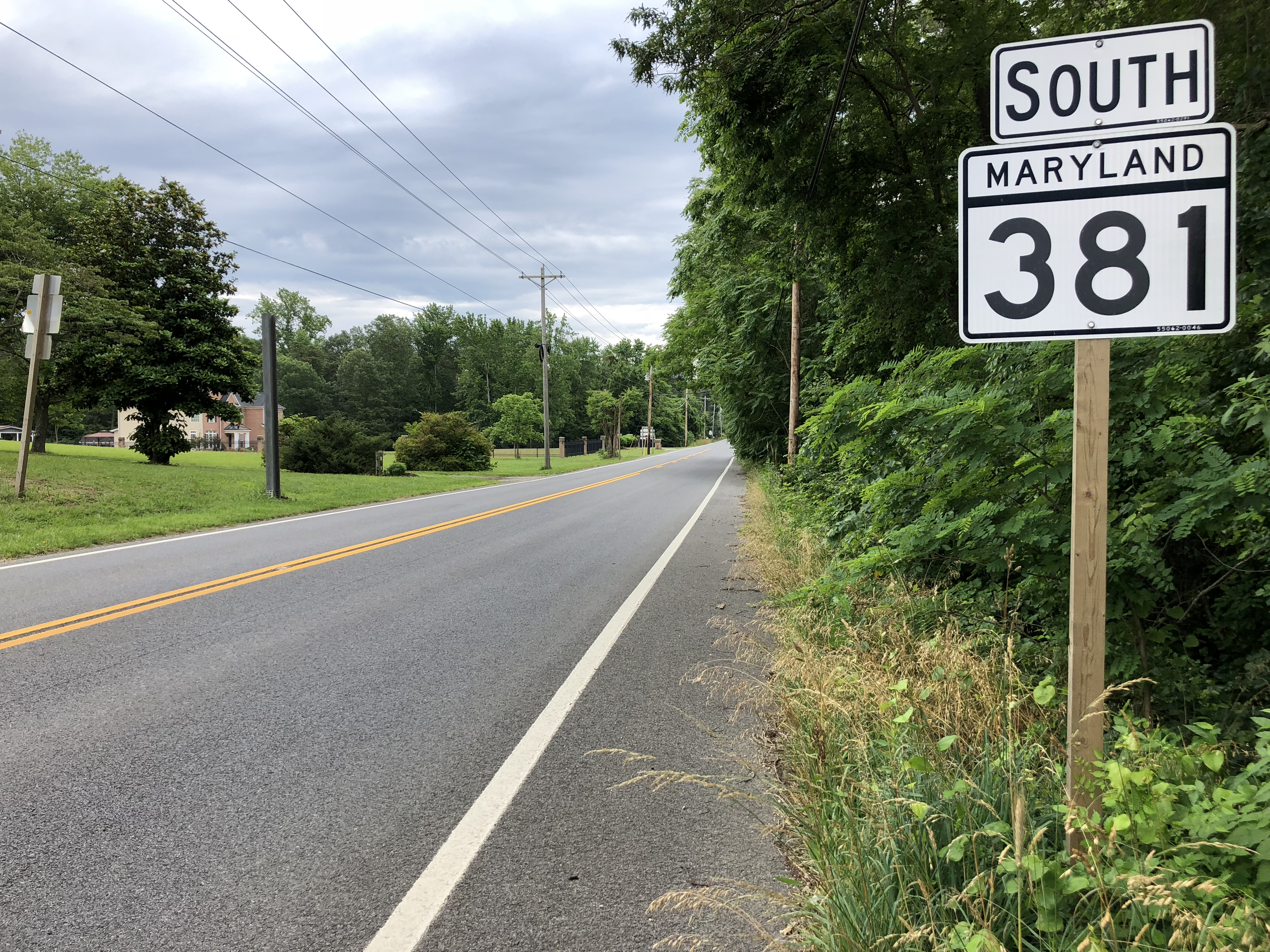
- View along Aquasco Road at Croom Road in Aquasco, MD

- Location in Maryland Aquasco (the United States)
- Coordinates: 38°35′6″N 76°43′30″W
- Country: United States
- State: Maryland
- County: Prince George's

Area
  - Total: 22.11 sq mi (57.27 km^{2})
  - Land: 19.78 sq mi (51.23 km^{2})
  - Water: 2.33 sq mi (6.04 km^{2})

Population (2020)
  - Total: 913
  - Density: 46.2/sq mi (17.82/km^{2})
- Time zone: UTC−5 (Eastern (EST))
  - Summer (DST): UTC−4 (EDT)
- FIPS code: 24-01925
- GNIS feature ID: 597013

Aquasco is an unincorporated area and census-designated place in southeastern Prince George's County, Maryland, United States, surrounding the town of Eagle Harbor and bordering Charles County. As of the 2020 census, the CDP had a population of 913. Aquasco was home to the Aquasco Speedway.

== Geography ==
Aquasco occupies the southeastern corner of Prince George's County and is centered on the intersection of Maryland Route 381, Aquasco Road, and Maryland Route 233, Dr. Bowen Road. The Patuxent River forms the eastern boundary of the community. As of the 2010 census, the CDP had a total area of 22.1 square miles (57.3 km^{2}), of which 19.8 square miles (51.3 km^{2}) was land and 2.3 square miles (6.0 km^{2}), or 10.55%, was water, consisting primarily of the Patuxent River.

The Aquasco CDP contains the Chalk Point Generating Station and surrounds the tiny incorporated town of Eagle Harbor.

== Demographics ==
Historical population
Census	Pop.	Note	%±
2010	981		—
2020	913		−6.9%
U.S. Decennial Census; 2010 2020

Aquasco first appeared as a census designated place in the 2010 U.S. census.

=== Racial and ethnic composition ===
Aquasco CDP, Maryland – Racial and ethnic composition Note: the US Census treats Hispanic/Latino as an ethnic category. This table excludes Latinos from the racial categories and assigns them to a separate category. Hispanics/Latinos may be of any race.
Race / Ethnicity (NH = Non-Hispanic)	Pop 2010	Pop 2020	% 2010	% 2020
White alone (NH)	525	460	53.52%	50.38%
Black or African American alone (NH)	422	356	43.02%	38.99%
Native American or Alaska Native alone (NH)	5	6	0.51%	0.66%
Asian alone (NH)	2	2	0.20%	0.22%
Native Hawaiian or Pacific Islander alone (NH)	0	0	0.00%	0.00%
Other race alone (NH)	0	1	0.00%	0.11%
Mixed race or Multiracial (NH)	12	43	1.22%	4.71%
Hispanic or Latino (any race)	15	45	1.53%	4.93%
Total	981	913	100.00%	100.00%

== History ==
Aquasco is named for a nearby tract first surveyed and patented in 1650. The name is derived from the Native American name Aquascake. Located between Swanson's Creek and the Patuxent River, the community developed as an agricultural center for the production of tobacco. The main roads connecting the widely scattered tobacco plantations were established in the 18th century and, in the early 19th century, the village of Woodville began to form. It was named after the Wood family, early settlers of Aquasco. By mid-century, the village had a grist mill, several small stores, a tavern, blacksmith, school, post office, and Methodist and Episcopal churches.

Because of the number of plantations, the slave population was relatively high in this section of Prince George's County. The Freedmen's Bureau established a school at Woodville in 1867. The school later became home to John Wesley Methodist Episcopal Church. African Americans also worshiped at St. Mary's Episcopal Church, established in 1848 as a mission church of St. Paul's Parish Church, which later became St. Phillip's Episcopal Church.

=== Historic sites ===
The following is a list of historic sites in Aquasco identified by the Maryland-National Capital Park and Planning Commission:

	Site Name	Image	Location	M-NCPPC Inventory Number	Comment
1	Adams-Bowen House		16002 Dr. Bowen Rd.	87B-036-19	
2	P.A. Bowen Farmstead		15701 Dr. Bowen Rd.	87B-036-20	
3	William R. Barker House		22600 Aquasco Rd.	87B-036-14	
4	Green Hill		19404 Aquasco Rd.	87A-011	
5	Grimes House		22609 Aquasco Rd.	87B-036-16	
6	John Wesley Methodist Episcopal Church Site and Cemetery		22919 Christ Church Road	87B-33	Historic church demolished.
7	St. Mary's Episcopal Church		22200 Saint Mary's Church Rd.	87B-036-37	
8	St. Mary's Rectory		16305 Saint Mary's Church Rd.	87B-036-08	Listed on the National Register of Historic Places, September 10, 1987
9	St. Phillip's Episcopal Church Site and Cemetery		16100 St. Phillip's Church Road	87B-36-12	Historic church destroyed by fire in 1976.
10	Sunnyside		16005 Dr. Bowen Rd.	87B-036-21	Listed on the National Register of Historic Places, May 29, 1987
11	H.B.B. Trueman House		20218 Aquasco Rd.	87A-022	
12	J.E. Turner House		16410 St. Mary's Church Road	87B-036-05	
13	Villa DeSales		22410 Aquasco Rd.	87B-036-13	Listed on the National Register of Historic Places, July 14, 1988
14	Wilson-Rawlings Farmstead		17109 Milltown Landing Road	87A-019	
15	Wood House		22606 Aquasco Rd.	87B-036-15	
16	Woodville School		21500 Aquasco Road	87B-34	

== Government ==
Prince George's County Police Department District 5 Station in Clinton CDP serves the community.

The U.S. Postal Service operates the Aquasco Post Office.

== Education ==
Aquasco residents are assigned to schools in Prince George's County Public Schools.

Residential areas of the CDP area are zoned to Baden Elementary School, Gwynn Park Middle School, and Gwynn Park High School.

== Notable person ==
- Leonard Covington, American brigadier general and member of the House of Representatives from Maryland
