= Digges-Sasscer house =

- Digges-Sasscer house
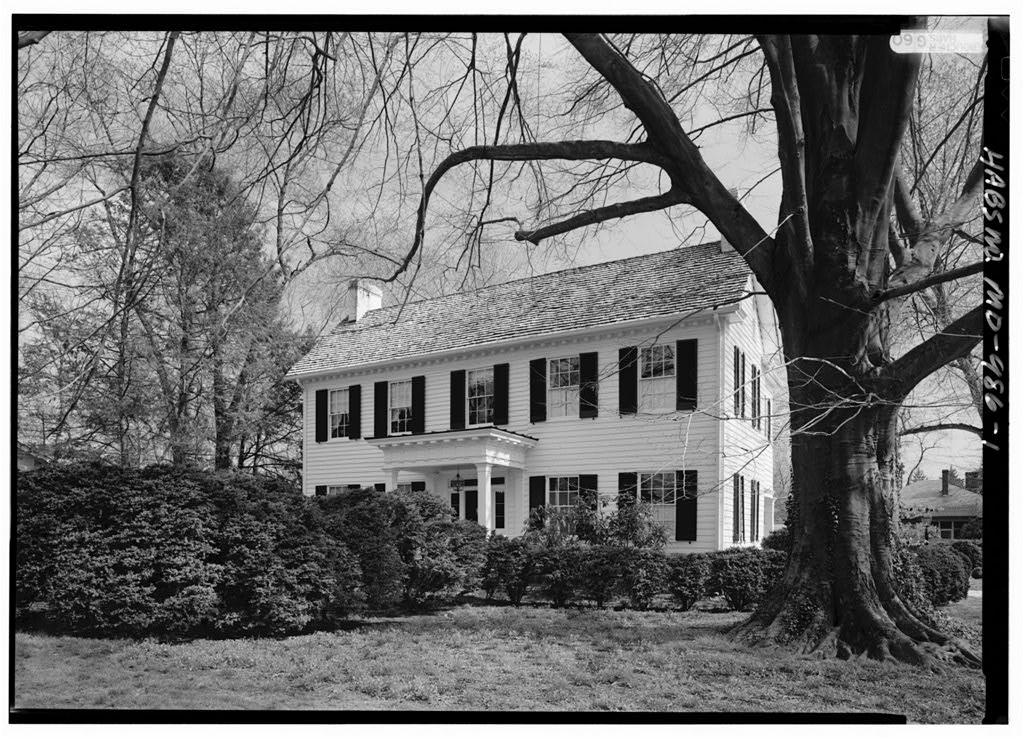
- Interactive map of the Digges-Sasscer house area

General information
- Architectural style: I-house
- Location: 14507 Elm Street, Upper Marlboro, Maryland, Upper Marlboro, Maryland, United States
- Coordinates: 38.8164°N 76.7539°W
- Owner: Lansdale Ghiselin Sasscer, Jr.

The Digges-Sasscer house is an historic building in Upper Marlboro, Maryland. It has been home to Lansdale Ghiselin Sasscer, Lansdale Ghiselin Sasscer, Jr. and Daniel Carroll Digges. The house has been documented by the Historic American Buildings Survey and is listed in the Maryland Historical Trust.

The earliest sections of the house date to the late 1700s.
