= Columbia Air Center =

Former airport in Croom, Maryland, US

- IATA: none; ICAO: none

Summary
- Operator: 1940–1941 - Cloud Club Inc. 1942–1944 - Naval Support Facility Anacostia (operated) 1944–1954 - John W. Greene Jr. and Dr. Coleridge M. Gill 1954–1956 - W&J Aviation (Charles Wren and Herbert H. Jones Jr.) 1956–1962 - Capitol Flying Club
- Opened: 1940
- Closed: 1962
- Elevation AMSL: 40 ft (12 m)
- Coordinates: 38°45′15″N 76°42′30″W
- Interactive map of Columbia Air Center

The Columbia Air Center was an airfield in Croom, Prince George's County, Maryland from 1940 to 1962. It was the first licensed Black-owned and operated airport in the United States of America. Robbins Airport in Robbins, IL was the only previously Black-owned airport, existing for 6 months in 1933. At different times in its history, the airport was known as Riverside Airfield and Croom Airport.

In the fall of 1940, the Cloud Club, Inc. flying club opened Riverside Airfield, which was named Columbia Air Center in 1944. The Cloud Club consisted of African American pilots living in the Washington, DC metro area. They were students of Charles Alfred Anderson, the famed African American pioneer aviator and future "Father of the Tuskegee Airmen."

The Cloud Club opened Riverside Airfield in fall of 1940. The attack on Pearl Harbor on December 7, 1940, halted civilian aviation operations around Washington, DC and the Anacostia US Naval Air Station commandeered the airfield from 1942 to 1944. The airport reopened as Columbia Air Center and operated until 1962. In 1961, landowner Rebecca Fisher died and her heirs refused to lease to African Americans. They sold the land to the Maryland-National Capital Park and Planning Commission and became part of Patuxent River Park.

== History ==
=== Origins ===
According to the Department of Commerce's Negro Statistical Bulletin No. 3, published September 1940, there were only 103 licensed African American aviators in the United States in 1937. The largest obstacle African Americans faced toward earning a pilot's license was lack of training. Flight schools would regularly deny African American applicants due to race, local pilots and flying clubs would do likewise. The second obstacle was the cost of training.

In 1938, Charles Alfred Anderson moved to the Washington, DC area and started teaching flight instruction. At first, Anderson tried opening his own airport, but his landlord terminated the lease when White neighbors complained. Anderson then moved his flight instruction to Buzzard's Point, a section of the Anacostia River near modern-day Audi Field, where Anderson taught out of a Piper Cub seaplane. Anderson then moved his flight training to Hybla Valley Airport and Beacon Field.

==== Charles Alfred Anderson and the Cloud Club ====
In the fall of 1939, seven of Anderson's private students formed a flying club and bought an airplane. It is first mentioned in the "Capital Spotlight" column of the Baltimore Afro-American newspaper: "Buck West, Roland Brawner, and John Pinkett have become aviation minded." In September 1939, the same column lists the members as “Alvin Barnes, Cholly (Buck) West, [Henry Lincoln] Link Johnson, John Pinkett Jr., Harvey Strothers, Arthur (Lil’ Arthur) Wilmer, Barrington Henry, Harold (Bicycle) Smith, and Roland Brawner." Many of these members were the children of DC’s Black elite or were businessmen themselves. In May 1940, they incorporated in Washington, DC under the name Cloud Club, Inc.

Louis Lautier, a reporter for the Baltimore Afro-American newspaper, regularly reported on the doings of the African American aviation community in his weekly column "Capital Spotlight" from 1939 to 1942. However, these reports were very brief, often consisting of no more than one or two sentences.

In 1939, Howard University was one of seven Black institutions admitted to the Civil Aeronautics Authority's Civilian Pilot Training Program (CPTP). Engineering Professor Addison E. Richmond organized the program at Howard, and he hired Charles A. Anderson to operate the flight training. Ground school was taught at Howard University and flight training was held at Hybla Valley Airport. In the summer of 1940, Tuskegee Institute hired Charles Alfred Anderson to teach their CPTP.

Yancey Williams was in Anderson's first class. After primary flight training, Williams continued on to secondary training at the Tuskegee Institute, which was the only Black CPTP to offer secondary training. When the US entered World War II, Williams applied to the US Army Air Corps and was rejected due to his race. Williams and his lawyer, Wendell McConnell filed a lawsuit against the War Department upon the legal precedent of "separate but equal." Thurgood Marshall, an NAACP lawyer, provided counsel. Either the War Department had to admit Williams into the Army Air Corps or create a unit for Williams to join. The day after the suit was filed, the War Department announced the creation of the 99th Pursuit Squadron, the first squadron of the Tuskegee Airmen. Historians debate the role of Williams lawsuit in the creation of the Tuskegee Airmen.

==== The Cloud Club is Evicted ====
After Anderson left the Washington, DC area for Tuskegee, the Cloud Club assumed operation of Howard University's CPTP. John R. Pinkett assumed the role of primary instructor and continued lessons out of Hybla Valley Airport. Tensions between the White and Black community had been worsening as the Black aviation community grew. Weeks into the fall semester, the Hybla Valley evicted the Cloud Club, which relocate to neighboring Beacon Field. Tensions remained high there and after much harassment the Cloud Club decided to leave and look for a new home. After weeks of searching, they were directed to a large, fallow farm field along the Patuxent River. This became the site of Riverside Airfield.

=== Riverside Airport (1940–1941) ===
The Cloud Club contact the landowner, Rebecca Fisher, a white woman from Cordova, MD. She rented the 100+ acres to the Cloud Club for $30.00 a month. The airport opened sometime in late fall of 1940. The Cloud Club resumed operation of Howard University's CPTP in January 1941. Riverside Airfield earned its license through its participation in CPTP.

The airport operation service, Cloud Club Inc. was Black-owned, though the land was rented from Rebecca Fisher, a white woman. The airport was owned and staffed by African Americans, with the occasional White flight instructor. It welcomed both Black and White pilots and students. The activities of Riverside Airport can be found reported in various national African American newspapers, including The Chicago Defender and Pittsburgh Courier.

Notably, famed jazz musician Jimmie Lunceford joined the Cloud Club early in 1941, possibly in late 1940. Having aspired to be a pilot, Lunceford reportedly helped fund the airport and had his band members help construct the earliest buildings. Lunceford reportedly earned his private pilot's license at Riverside Airfield. When Lunceford died, the Cloud Club sent special airplane floral arrangements to his funeral.

Riverside Airfield was an active airfield, offering private instruction, operating Howard University's CPTP, and hosting air shows and other community activities. In October 1941, the Cloud Club hired fellow member and aviation pioneer John W. Greene Jr. as the airport manager.

==== John W Greene Jr. ====
John Greene was a pioneering African American aviator who had earned his private pilot's license in 1929. He was the second African American to earn an air transport pilot's license (behind Charles Alfred Anderson) and the first African American to earn an airplane engine mechanics license. A Georgia native, he had lived in the Boston area from 1923 to 1940, where he worked as a mechanic with E.W. Wiggins Airways from 1943 to 1940. Greene's primary job was leading the District of Columbia Public Schools aeronautics program at Black vocational high schools, primarily Phelps Vocational School and Armstrong High School.

==== Riverside Airfield Details ====
The Cloud Club erected one hangar, ordered from a catalog, and built a small office building. The airfield had four runways, which were mowed grass.

=== World War II and naval use (1942–1944) ===
The attack on Pearl Harbor in December 1941 halted civilian aviation around the nation's capital. In February 1942, the Anacostia US Naval Air Station commandeered the airfield for practice. The Cloud Club seemingly disbands during World War II and many of its members serve in the war effort. Notably, John R. Pinkett Jr., the Cloud Club's president, became a civilian flight instructor stationed at the 66th Army Air Force Flight Training Division, at Tuskegee Institute. John Greene served as a senior aircraft mechanic at Camp Springs Army Airfield near Croom, MD—today the airfield is Andrews Air Force Base.

The Navy made a number of improvements to the airfield. They increased the number of runways from four to eight, improved the grading, and created a pier on the Patuxent River.

=== Columbia Air Center (1944–1954) ===
Likely due to his proximity to Riverside Airfield, John Greene stayed up to date on the Navy's use of Riverside Airfield. In August 1944, he was notified that the Navy was ending its use of the airfield. Greene partnered with Dr. Coleridge M. Gill, a pilot and Howard University medical professor and a doctor at Freedman's Hospital, to reopen the airfield. They reopened the airfield as Columbia Air Center in December 1944. Greene received licenses to operate the airfield through the Maryland State Aviation Commission.

Greene and Dr. Gill co-owned the airport, while Greene managed the operations. Columbia Air Center was an active airfield, welcoming private flight students, Civil Air Patrol cadets, and DC public school aeronautics students.

==== Columbia Air Center Details ====
The 1950 edition of the Maryland Airport Directory lists the following eight runways, weekday hours from 3pm until sunset and weekend hours from 8am to sunset. It also lists Columbia Air Center as providing the following services:

- Major and minor repairs
- 80 and 91 Octane gas and oil
- Hangar space
- Tiedowns
- Lunch Room
- Charter Service
- Aircraft Sales.

==== First All-Black Civil Air Patrol Squadron, Columbia Squadron ====
As a member of the Civil Air Patrol, Greene created the first All-Black Civil Air Patrol Squadron, Columbia Squadron, National Capital Wing, c. 1945. Many Black veterans, including former Tuskegee Airmen, joined the Columbia Air Center, and many of these veterans joined the Civil Air Patrol's Columbia Squadron. They include Herbert H. Jones Jr., Charles Wren, William Taylor, Roscoe Taylor, Charles Taylor, and William H. Rhodes.

The creation of Columbia Squadron soon led to the creation of a 2nd all-Black squadron, Syphax Squadron.

=== W&J Aviation and the Capital Flying Club (1954–1962) ===
Greene retired in 1954, at the age of 54. His wife Eunice Daniels Greene had recently died, and he had been wanting to complete his unfinished bachelor's degree at Hampton Institute for some time. By 1954, more airports were desegregating, and Dr. Gill seemingly moved to a closer airport.

Charles Wren and Herbert Jones Jr., both Columbia Air Center members, veterans, and Civil Air Patrol officers, assumed operation of Columbia Air Center. They operated under the name W&J Aviation. In 1956, Herbert Jones left and took a job as a private pilot for a commercial fishing company.

Albert L. Young and William Taylor joined Charles Wren in owning and operating the airfield. Their venture was named the Capital Flying Club. At this time, the airfield may have also been known as Columbia Airport.

Columbia Air Center's attendance had reportedly been diminishing since 1954. Jones credits this to three major reasons:

- Columbia Air Center was very far for most pilots and by 1954 other general aviation airports in the region had started desegregating. Some pilots decided to fly out of closer airports.
- Additionally, John Greene was a beloved manager and community figure. Jones attributes Greene's retirement as a reason for some pilots deciding to fly out of closer airports.
- The G.I. Bill expired in 1956 and many Black pilots relied on this funding to fly. With the expiration of the GI Bill, Columbia Air Center lost students.

=== Closure (1962) ===
Rebecca Fisher died c. 1961 and her heirs refused to continue leasing to African Americans. The exact closure of the airfield is unknown. The Capital Flying Club received a notice terminating the lease on January 22, 1962. However, the Capital Flying Club signed an agreement with the Pelican Sky on May 7, 1962.

The 1962 edition of the Maryland Airport Directory includes an entry for "Croom" and lists Harold F. Zepp as the airport manager.

Fisher's heirs sold the land to the Maryland-National Capital Park and Planning Commission (MNCPPC), which used the land as part of Patuxent River Park, which opened in 1962.

== Legacy ==
Columbia Air Center was the nation's first licensed Black-owned and operated airport. It was home to one of only seven Black Civilian Pilot Training Programs (CPTP) and that program had previously been led by pioneering pilot Charles Alfred Anderson. Columbia Air Center welcomed another pioneer pilot, John W. Greene Jr., the first licensed Black airplane engine mechanic - who earned his license before Cornelius Coffey - and welcomed jazz musician Jimmie Lunceford as a member. Additionally, a number of Tuskegee Airmen flew at Columbia Air Center after World War II. Educating African Americans in aviation was the core mission of Columbia Air Center, doing so through Civil Air Patrol cadet programs, DC vocational schools' aeronautics programs, and through private instruction. Most notably, Captain Fred M.A. Pitcher learned to fly at Columbia Air Center. Western Airlines hired Pitcher in 1965, and he became one of the first African American commercial airline pilots.

Herbert Jones remained a prolific member of the aviation community. For most of his adult life, he was part of the Civil Air Patrol. He attained the rank of Lieutenant Colonel and served as a training officer, Group Commander and Director of Operations at the National Capital Wing. In 1972, he co-created International Air Association (IAA) (1970s), which was the first Black-owned charter airline. IAA was inspired by the Shillelagh's Travel Club, which is an Irish American travel club. At 64 years of age, Herbert Jones and his wife Mildred established "Cloud Club II" in Fort Washington, MD, in homage to the original Cloud Club. He trained over 150 students in 20 years, conducting flight training for Morgan State University, The East Coast Chapter of the Tuskegee Airmen, Inc.'s Youth In Aviation program - which named the program after Jones in 1995, and orientation flights for the National Black Coalition of Federal Aviation Employees. He retired from aviation instruction in the early 2000s. Cloud Club II, which became HJ Aviation, continues today under different ownership as Columbia Training Centers, a non-profit organization.

Physically, there are almost no remains of Columbia Air Center. The runways were mown grass and the buildings were torn down to create Patuxent River Park. An aircraft gas pump was one of the only remaining structures, located on the ground from c.1945 - 2000. In 2000, MNCPPC relocated the gas pump to College Park Aviation Museum for restoration, care, and display.

== Preserving the History of Columbia Air Center ==
College Park Aviation Museum (CPAM), which is owned and operated by the Maryland-National Capital Park and Planning Commission (MNCPPC), holds the only known collection relating to Columbia Air Center. This collection began in the 1980s, as part of MNCPPC's Black History Project. The Black History Project did not have appropriate staff or storage facilities so the collections was transferred to CPAM, being Prince George's County's aviation museum. Since 2021, CPAM has actively been seeking out community members and descendants of Columbia Air Center members in order to grow the knowledge of this history.

After the death of Herbert Jones Jr. in 2020, his family have lent over 600 physical and archival items to CPAM for preservation, research, and exhibition. As of August 2025, most of this collection is digitally available via Digital Maryland, at Digital Maryland - Digital Maryland

CPAM currently features Another Field of Firsts: The Columbia Air Center and African American Aviators in Prince George’s County.
