= William Williams (soldier) =

American soldier in the War of 1812

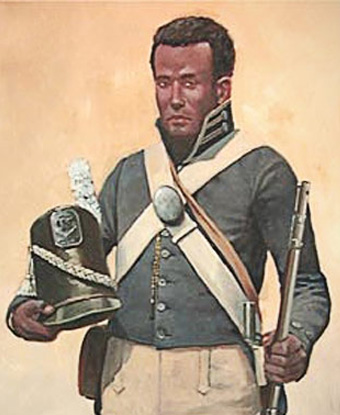
- Born: Frederick Hall c. 1793; Croom, Prince George's County, Maryland, U.S.
- Died: March 19, 1815 (aged 21); Baltimore, Maryland, U.S.
- Occupations: slave, soldier
- Military career
- Allegiance: United States
- Branch: U.S. Army 38th U.S. Infantry Regiment
- Service years: 1814
- Rank: private
- Conflicts: War of 1812: Battle of Baltimore (1814) (DOW)

Frederick Hall, who used the alias William Williams was a runaway African American slave who enlisted as a private in the U.S. Army during the War of 1812 and died from a mortal wound while defending Fort McHenry from the British naval bombardment in 1814.

== Early life ==
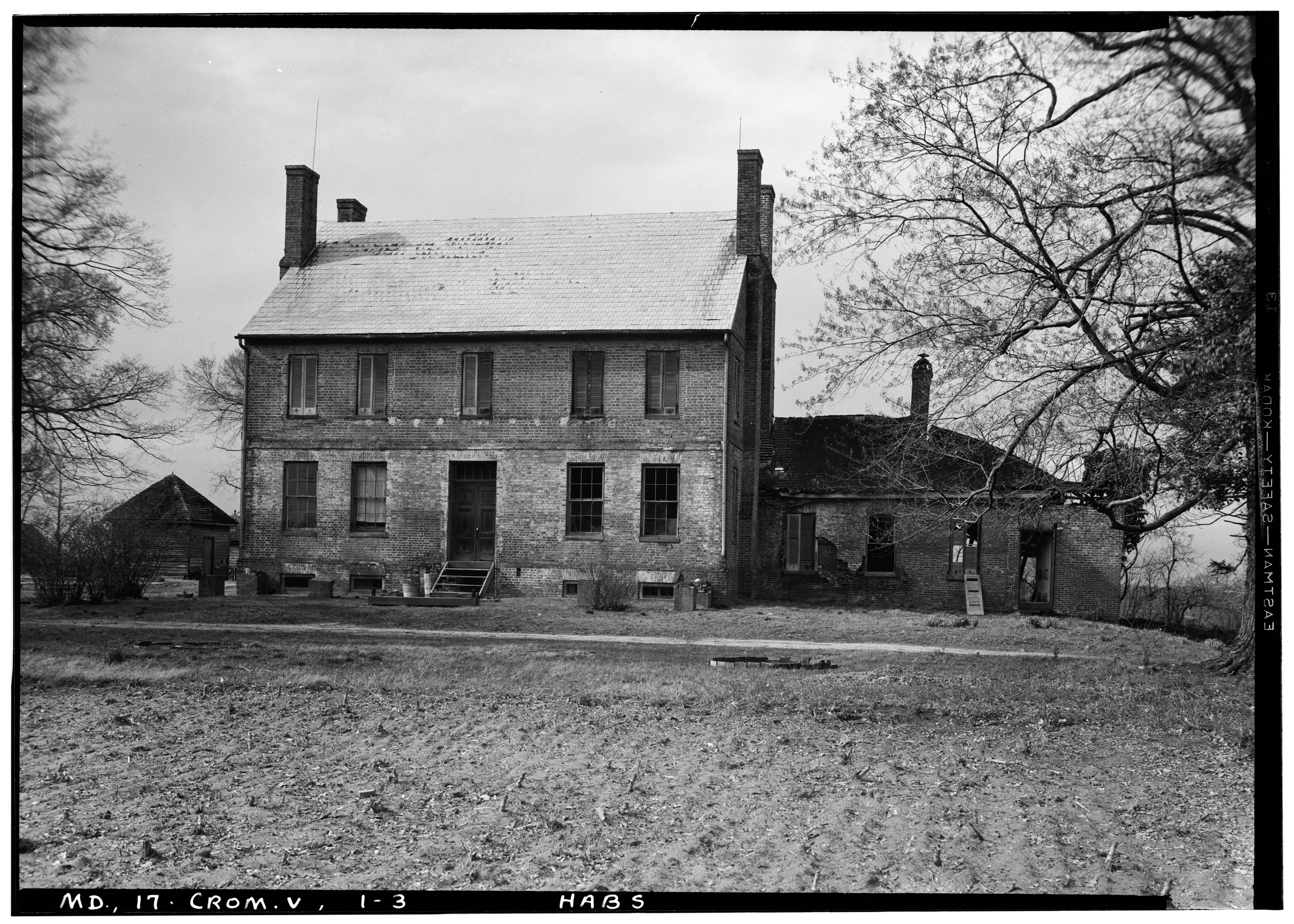
Bellefields Plantation in Croom, Prince George's County, Maryland where Frederick Hall aka William Williams spent most his life a slave, photograph from 1936

Frederick Hall was born on a plantation owned by Benjamin Oden in Prince George's County in 1793, he lived on the plantation until his escape in early 1814; despite the standing British offer of freedom and land to any escaped slave who joined the British army or navy, Williams enlisted in the United States Army in mid 1814. He was assigned to the 38th U.S. Infantry in Baltimore and received an enlistment bonus of $50, and wages of $8 per month.

== Death ==
Williams traveled with his unit to Fort McHenry on September 10, 1814, two days before the British landed near Baltimore. During the bombardment on September 13 and 14, Williams was posted with an infantry detachment of 600 men in the dry ditch surrounding the fort to repulse any British land assault. He and his fellow soldiers endured a 25-hour bombardment wherein over 1,500 explosive shells were fired at the fort and its gun crews. Williams was severely wounded, having his “leg blown off by a cannon ball”

Williams served with the 38th U.S. Infantry until October 25, 1814 when he presented to the 10th District General Military Hospital in Baltimore due to tuberculosis-related symptoms. Dr. Tobias Watkins, Regimental Surgeon of the 38th U.S. Infantry, treated him, but Williams died at the hospital while still a soldier on March 19, 1815. His former enslaver Benjamin Oden petitioned Congress in 1832 for the right to be issued Williams' potential service-related land bounty, but was rejected by the House Committee on Private Land Claims in March 1836.

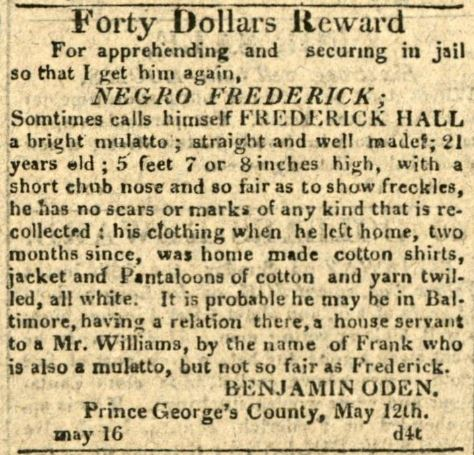
William Williams was the alias used by Frederick Hall, a slave who ran away from his master during the War of 1812 to join the U.S. Army, from a runaway slave notice on May 16, 1814, in the Baltimore, Maryland newspaper, American Commercial and Daily Advertiser

== See also ==
- Fort McHenry
