= Daniel Carroll Digges =

American politician

- In office 1849–?

Personal details
- Died: 1860
- Education: Georgetown University
- Occupation: attorney

Daniel Carroll Digges served on the Maryland House of Delegates in 1849 and served twice as state's attorney for Prince George's County, Maryland.

He attended Georgetown University in the 1830s, where he was a founding member of the Philodemic Society.

In 1843, he purchased the Digges-Sasscer house in Upper Marlboro, Maryland.
