= Cedarville, Maryland =

- Census-designated place
- Location within the state of Maryland Cedarville, Maryland (the United States)
- Coordinates: 38°39′46″N 76°48′07″W
- Country: United States
- State: Maryland
- County: Prince George's

Area
  - Total: 13.39 sq mi (34.69 km^{2})
  - Land: 13.28 sq mi (34.40 km^{2})
  - Water: 0.11 sq mi (0.29 km^{2})
- Elevation: 266 ft (81 m)

Population (2020)
  - Total: 639
  - Density: 48.1/sq mi (18.58/km^{2})
- Time zone: UTC−5 (Eastern (EST))
  - Summer (DST): UTC−4 (EDT)
- Area codes: 301, 240
- FIPS code: 24-14800
- GNIS feature ID: 597207

Cedarville is an unincorporated community and census-designated place in southern Prince George's County, Maryland, United States. As of the 2020 census the population was 639.

== Geography ==
According to the U.S. Census Bureau, Cedarville had an area of 9.0 square miles (23.3 km^{2}), all land. The CDP is bordered to the northwest by Brandywine, to the north by Croom CDP, to the east by Baden, and to the south by Charles County.

== Demographics ==
Historical population
Census	Pop.	Note	%±
2010	717		—
2020	639		−10.9%
U.S. Decennial Census; 2010 2020

Cedarville first appeared as a census designated place in the 2010 U.S. census.

=== Racial and ethnic composition ===
Cedarville CDP, Maryland – Racial and ethnic composition Note: the US Census treats Hispanic/Latino as an ethnic category. This table excludes Latinos from the racial categories and assigns them to a separate category. Hispanics/Latinos may be of any race.
Race / Ethnicity (NH = Non-Hispanic)	Pop 2010	Pop 2020	% 2010	% 2020
White alone (NH)	470	318	65.55%	49.77%
Black or African American alone (NH)	199	165	27.75%	25.82%
Native American or Alaska Native alone (NH)	19	22	2.65%	3.44%
Asian alone (NH)	13	11	1.81%	1.72%
Native Hawaiian or Pacific Islander alone (NH)	0	0	0.00%	0.00%
Other race alone (NH)	0	2	0.00%	0.31%
Mixed race or Multiracial (NH)	13	33	1.81%	5.16%
Hispanic or Latino (any race)	3	88	0.42%	13.77%
Total	717	639	100.00%	100.00%

== Education ==
Cedarville residents are assigned to schools in Prince George's County Public Schools.

Residential areas of the CDP area are zoned to Brandywine Elementary School, Gwynn Park Middle School, and Gwynn Park High School.
