= Lansdale Ghiselin Sasscer Jr. =

American politician, attorney and journalist (1926–2020)

Member of the Maryland House of Delegates from the Prince George's County district
- In office 1955–1963

Personal details
- Born: September 25, 1926
- Died: April 13, 2020 (aged 93)
- Party: Democrat
- Spouse: Anne Mackall Sasscer
- Children: Becky Sasscer Henderson Anne Sasscer Newman Molly Sasscer Kanellos
- Occupation: attorney, journalist, politician

Lansdale Ghiselin Sasscer Jr. (September 25, 1926 – April 13, 2020) was a member of the Maryland House of Delegates, serving from 1955 to 1963.

He was the son of former President of the Maryland Senate and member of the United States House of Representatives for seven terms from 1939–1953, Lansdale Sasscer

During World War II Sasscer served in the United States Coast Guard. After the war he entered law school, his first year of law school in an accelerated postwar program at the University of Virginia, and finishing his degree at the University of Maryland at Baltimore. he decided to run for the House of Delegates representing Prince George's County, Maryland in 1954 at the age of 28 as a Democrat.

In 1962, he ran for the Maryland State Senate and lost. Later he served on the board of Directors of the Bank of Brandywine.

Sasscer's family has lived in Upper Marlboro, Maryland since the 1760s and he resided with his wife Anne in the historic Digges-Sasscer house.

Sasscer died at his home on April 13, 2020, at the age of 93.
