= St. Paul's Parish Church (Brandywine, Maryland) =

Historic church in Maryland, United States

- U.S. National Register of Historic Places
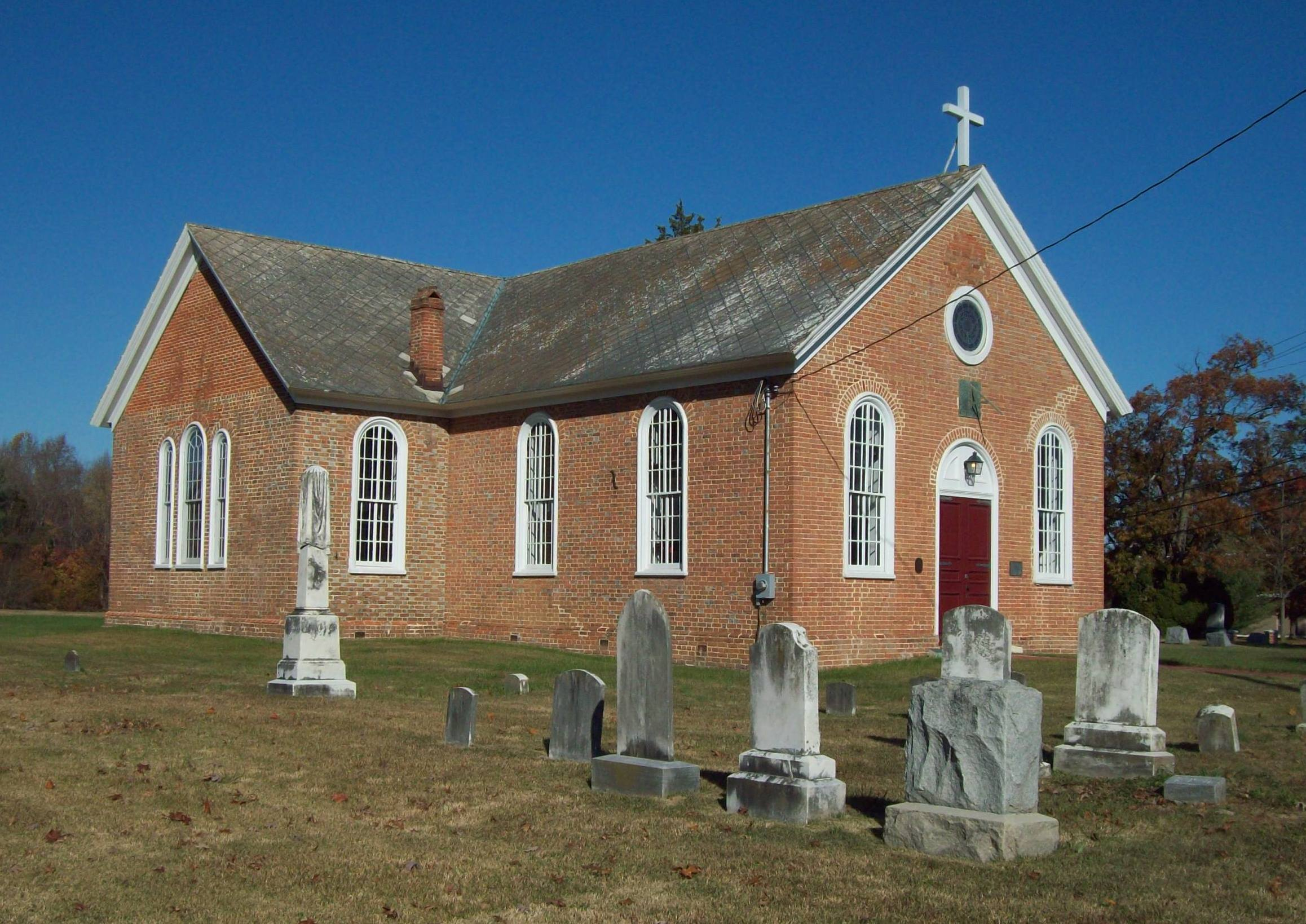
- St. Paul's Parish Church, November 2011

- Location within Maryland Location within the United States
- Location: 13500 Baden Westwood Road off Maryland Route 381, Brandywine, Maryland
- Coordinates: 38°39′40″N 76°46′20″W
- Area: 5 acres (2.0 ha)
- Built: 1733-1921
- Architectural style: Neo-Georgian
- NRHP reference No.: 77001521
- Added to NRHP: September 15, 1977

St. Paul's Church, also known as St. Paul's Church, Baden, or St. Paul's Parish, Prince George's County, is located at 13500 Baden-Westwood Road, in Baden, a community near Brandywine in Prince George's County, Maryland. It was originally constructed in 1733–1735. A porch on the north side was enclosed in 1769, and in 1793 an addition of 26 by 30 feet was made to the south side. The Bishop's Window, a memorial to Bishop Thomas John Claggett, is at the chancel window. In 1921 the sanctuary was widened and the chancel deepened.

St. Paul's Church is significant in the history of the Episcopal Church in Maryland for several reasons. First, the perpetuation of this church has provided a record of the religious life of its founders and the generations who followed beginning in 1733. Secondly, St. Paul's illustrates the evolution of a small, rural, colonial church into an American-style cruciform structure. Third, St. Paul's also demonstrates the part that agriculture, particularly of tobacco, played in the 18th century history of the Church of England in Maryland.

The building is a brick structure laid up in Flemish bond with a pattern of glazed headers where the brickwork has not been altered. The plan is a Latin cross, with a nave two bays long and transept arms one bay long; the present apse is an alteration.

It was listed on the National Register of Historic Places in 1977.

== History of St. Paul's Parish ==
In 1692, the Church of England became the established church of the Province of Maryland through an Act of the General Assembly. Ten counties had been established in the colony, and those counties were divided into 30 parishes. St. Paul's Parish was one of these first 30. From 1692 until Prince George's County was created in 1696, it was in Calvert County. In 1704, St. Paul's Parish was divided by the General Assembly and the northern part became Queen Anne Parish, while the remainder continued as St. Paul's Parish.

St. Paul's Parish is one of 4 of the original 30 with that name. The others are St. Paul's Protestant Episcopal Church (Baltimore, Maryland), St. Paul's Church, Centreville, Maryland and St. Paul's Church (Fairlee, Maryland).
