= St. Mary's Rectory (Aquasco, Maryland) =

- Saint Mary's Rectory
- U.S. National Register of Historic Places
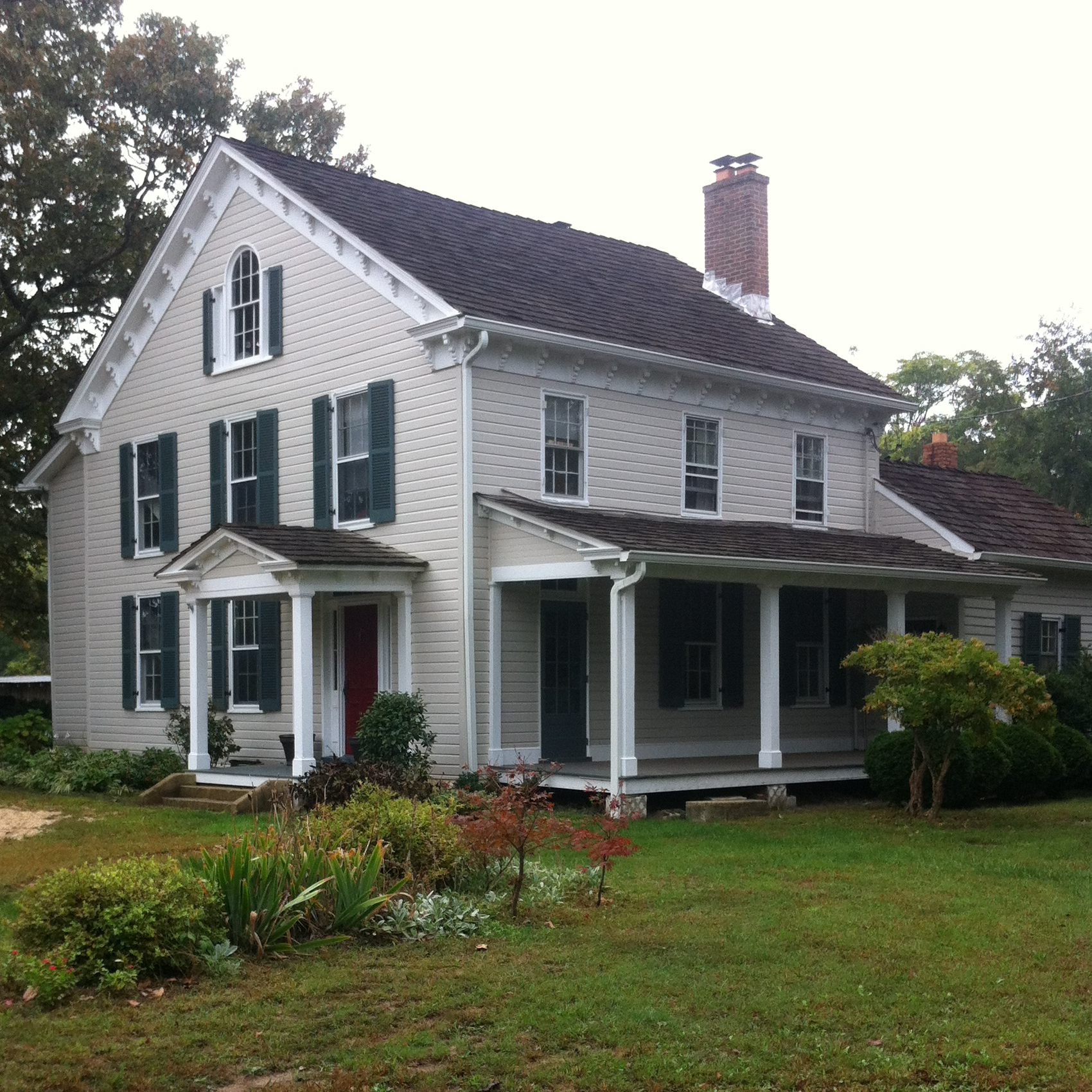
- Saint Mary's Rectory, October 2012 (post-restoration)

- Location within Maryland Location within the United States
- Location: 16305 Saint Mary's Church Rd., Aquasco, Maryland
- Coordinates: 38°35′5″N 76°43′22″W
- Area: 5 acres (2.0 ha)
- Built: 1849
- Architect: Townshend, Jeremiah
- Architectural style: Greek Revival, Italianate, Vernacular Greek Revival
- NRHP reference No.: 87001572
- Added to NRHP: September 10, 1987

The old St. Mary's Rectory is a gable-front 2 1/2-story frame dwelling of three by three bays, built in 1849 and enlarged to twice its size in 1856, and located in Aquasco, Prince George's County, Maryland. The structure is significant for its architecture and for its association with the history of St. Paul's Parish and the community of Aquasco. The rectory is an excellent example of a vernacular building with Greek Revival and Italianate stylistic elements. The floor plan exemplifies a style typical of the dwellings of successful landowners and merchants of the mid-19th century in Prince George's County. Original Greek Revival style elements include the front gable entrance facade, crown molded returned cornice, porch detail, interior stair detail, door and window surrounds, and the parlor mantel. Italianate elements include the heavy bracketing of the exterior cornice and the tripartite window in the north gable end.

The old rectory served St. Paul's Parish (Episcopal) through 1977, when it was sold as a private residence. Rehabilitated by its present owners, the rectory contains a significant amount of original fabric and is little changed from its mid-19th-century appearance. It is located in Aquasco, one of three remaining examples of a well-preserved agricultural community in Prince George's County. Aquasco reached its height in the 19th century, and is the location of a number of large 19th-century planters' homes. The rectory was stylishly built, perhaps because of its location in the thriving village and because of the affluence.

A grant was awarded to the rectory by Prince George's County Planning Board which enabled the rectory to undergo significant exterior restoration in 2011. The most valuable improvement was the removal of asbestos siding and the delicate restoration of the beautiful original German siding beneath.

It was listed on the National Register of Historic Places in 1987.
