= Bellefields (Croom, Maryland) =

Historic house in Maryland, US

- U.S. National Register of Historic Places
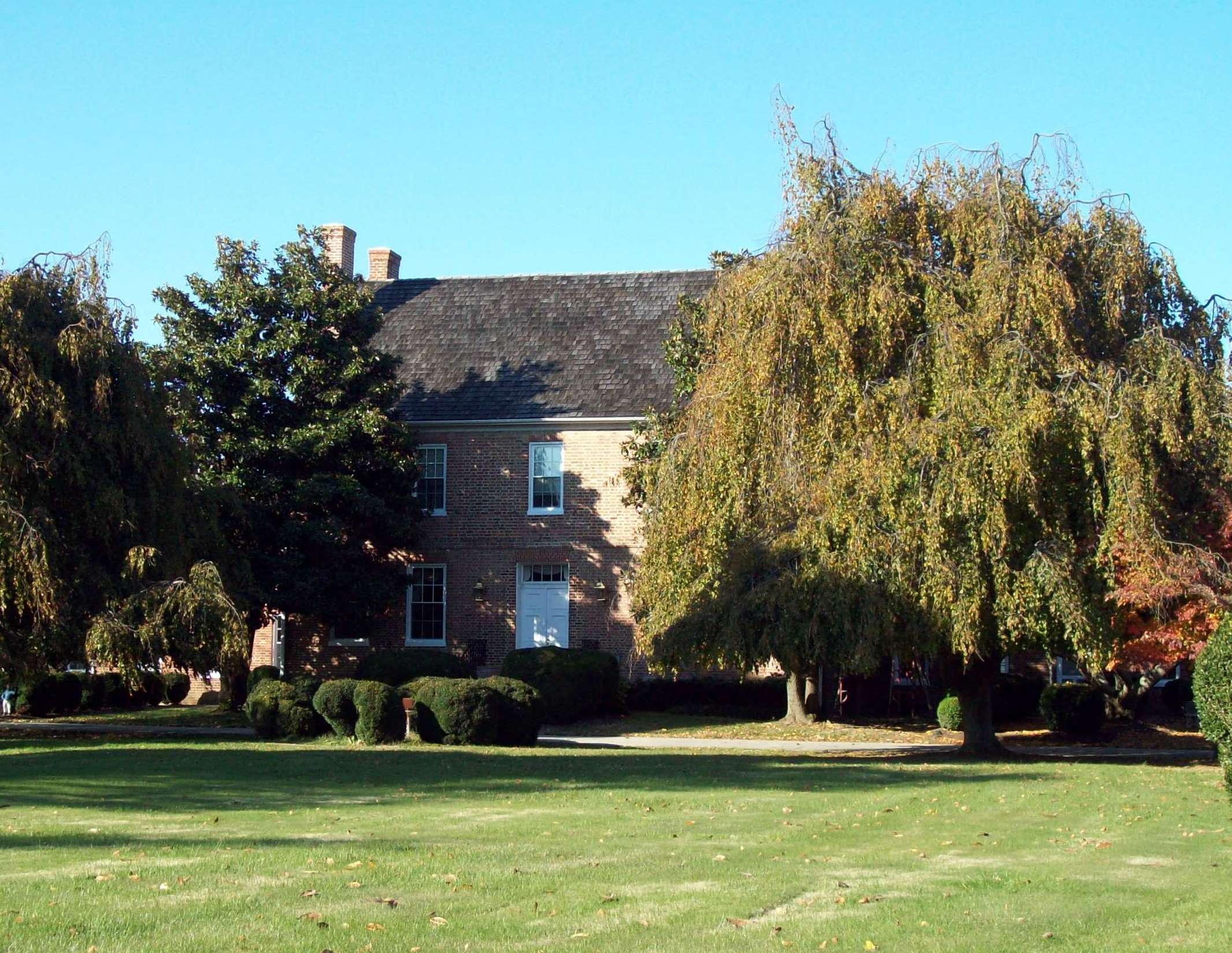
- Bellefields, November 2011

- Location within Maryland Location within the United States
- Location: 13104 Duley Station Road, Croom, Maryland
- Coordinates: 38°44′45″N 76°46′38″W
- Built: c. 1720
- Architectural style: Georgian
- NRHP reference No.: 71001027
- Added to NRHP: September 10, 1971

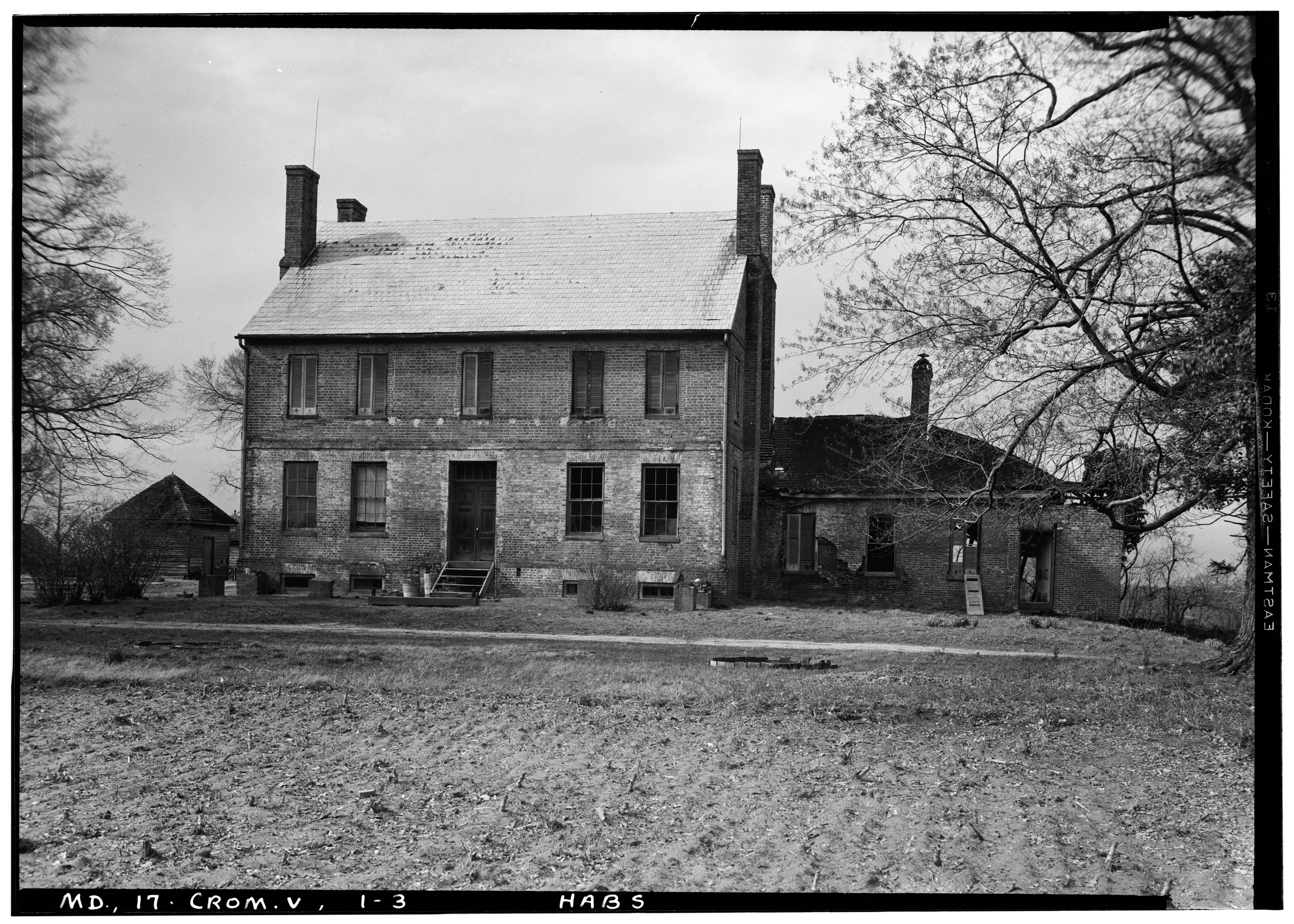
Bellefields Plantation House from a 1936 Historic American Buildings Survey photograph

Bellefields is a manor house located in Croom, Prince George's County, Maryland. It was constructed about 1720. It is a brick structure in Flemish bond with random glazed headers, and two stories over a high basement. The structure is rectangular, with gabled roof sections, paired interior end chimneys, a front center entrance, wide raised belt course above the first floor, flat arched openings, and flanking symmetrical single-story wings. It is in the Georgian style. It was the home of Patrick Sim, Scottish immigrant and of his son, Col. Joseph Sim, Maryland patriot.

== History ==
Later, sometime after 1849, William Duckett Bowie lived there with his second wife.

It was listed on the National Register of Historic Places in 1974. It was removed from the National Register of Historic Places on May 12, 1986.

On August 31, 2021, three of the farm's 39 zebras escaped from the farm and began wandering around the woods of Upper Marlboro. In September, one of the zebras died in an illegal snare trap. In October, the Maryland Department of the Environment and the Prince George's County Animal Services announced a plan to use two zebras from the herd at Bellefields to lure and corral the zebras back to the farm. Three animal cruelty charges were filed against the farm's owner on October 20. On December 15, the two remaining zebras were captured and returned to the farm.

== Notable people ==
- William Williams (c. 1793–1814), born Frederick Hall on the Bellefields Plantation and as an escaped slave enlisted in 38th U.S. Infantry Regiment, U.S. Army dying from his wounds after the British bombardment of Fort McHenry in the War of 1812.
