= Sunnyside (Aquasco, Maryland) =

Historic house in Maryland, United States

- U.S. National Register of Historic Places
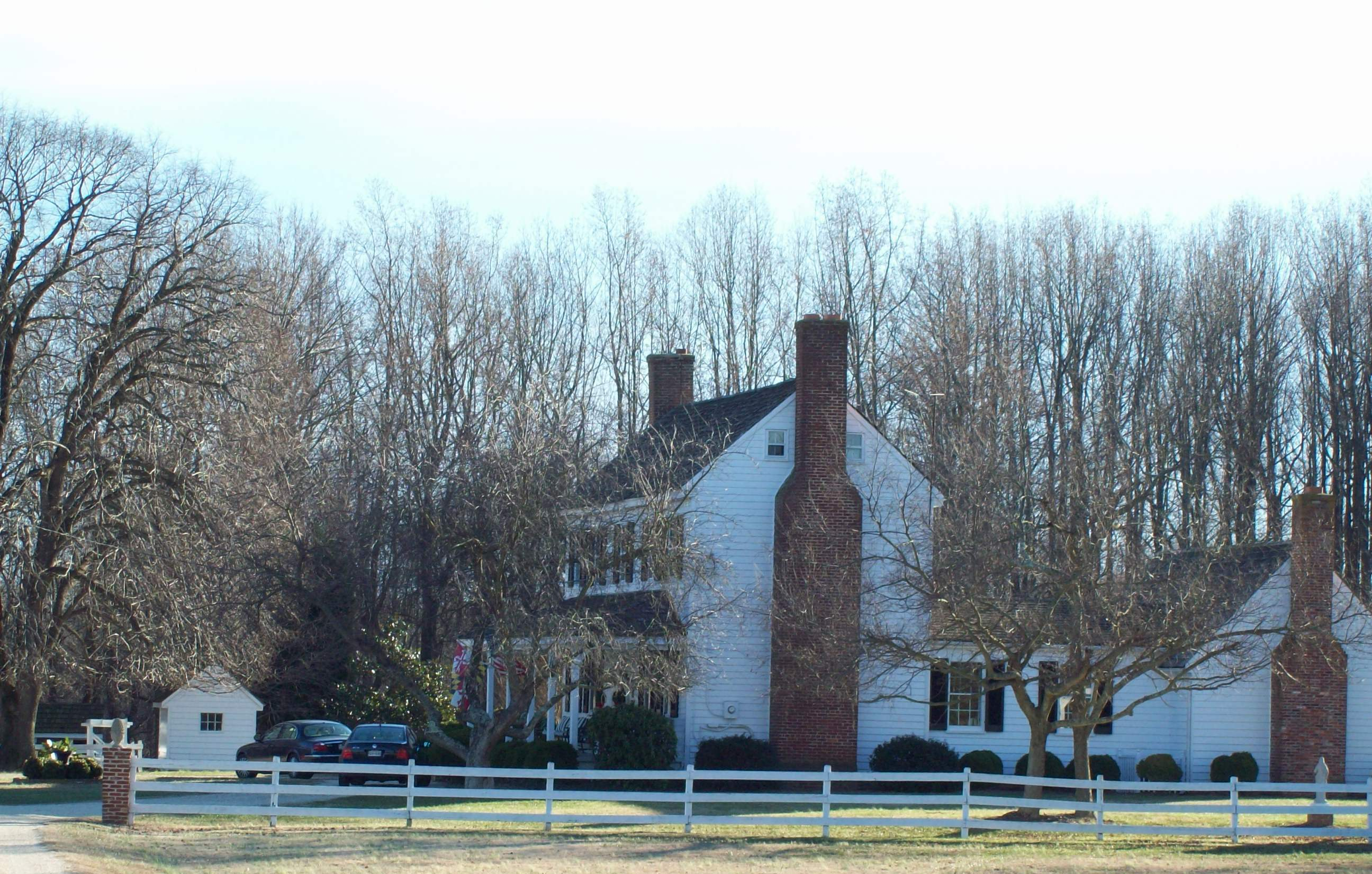
- Sunnyside, December 2008

- Location within Maryland Location within the United States
- Location: 16005 Dr. Bowen Rd., Aquasco, Maryland
- Coordinates: 38°35′5″N 76°43′41″W
- Area: 21.3 acres (8.6 ha)
- Built: 1844
- Architectural style: I-house
- NRHP reference No.: 87000840
- Added to NRHP: May 29, 1987

Sunnyside is a historic home located in Aquasco, Prince George's County, Maryland, United States. It is a five bay wide two-story frame house with a center hall and north and south parlors, facing east on a brick foundation. The building dates to 1844. The main block of the house is a fine example of a mid-19th century I-house, and possesses a great deal of intact original fabric. The significance of the property is enhanced by the 18th century wing, in good repair and possessing its original hearth with iron fittings. The house and outbuildings are well preserved examples of vernacular southern Maryland architecture dating from the 18th through the mid 19th century.

Sunnyside is also significant for its association with its builder, Dr. Michael Jenifer Stone (II) (1804-1877). Descendants of Dr. Stone inhabited the property through 1980. Dr. Stone, prominent in the Aquasco community and in Prince George's County, was the son of Michael Jenifer Stone, a member of the United States House of Representatives, and nephew of Thomas Stone, a signer of the United States Declaration of Independence.

It was listed on the National Register of Historic Places in 1987.
