= Brookefield of the Berrys =

Historic house in Maryland, US

- U.S. National Register of Historic Places
- Location within Maryland Location within the United States
- Location: 12510 Molly Berry Rd., Croom, Maryland
- Coordinates: 38°43′4″N 76°45′13″W
- Area: 10 acres (4.0 ha)
- Built: 1810
- Architectural style: Greek Revival
- NRHP reference No.: 87001032
- Added to NRHP: June 25, 1987

Brookefield of the Berrys is a historic house located at Croom, Prince George's County, Maryland, United States. It is a 2 1/2-story frame house begun about 1810 in the Federal style, and completed in 1840, in the Greek Revival style. The house was finished in 1840 by John Thomas Berry, a prominent plantation family in southern Prince George's County. Berry and his descendants lived at Brookefield from 1840 until 1976. This 19th-century farmstead is well represented by the complex of outbuildings surrounding the house.

Brookefield of the Berrys was listed on the National Register of Historic Places in 1987.
