= Waverly (Croom, Maryland) =

Historic house in Maryland, United States

- U.S. National Register of Historic Places
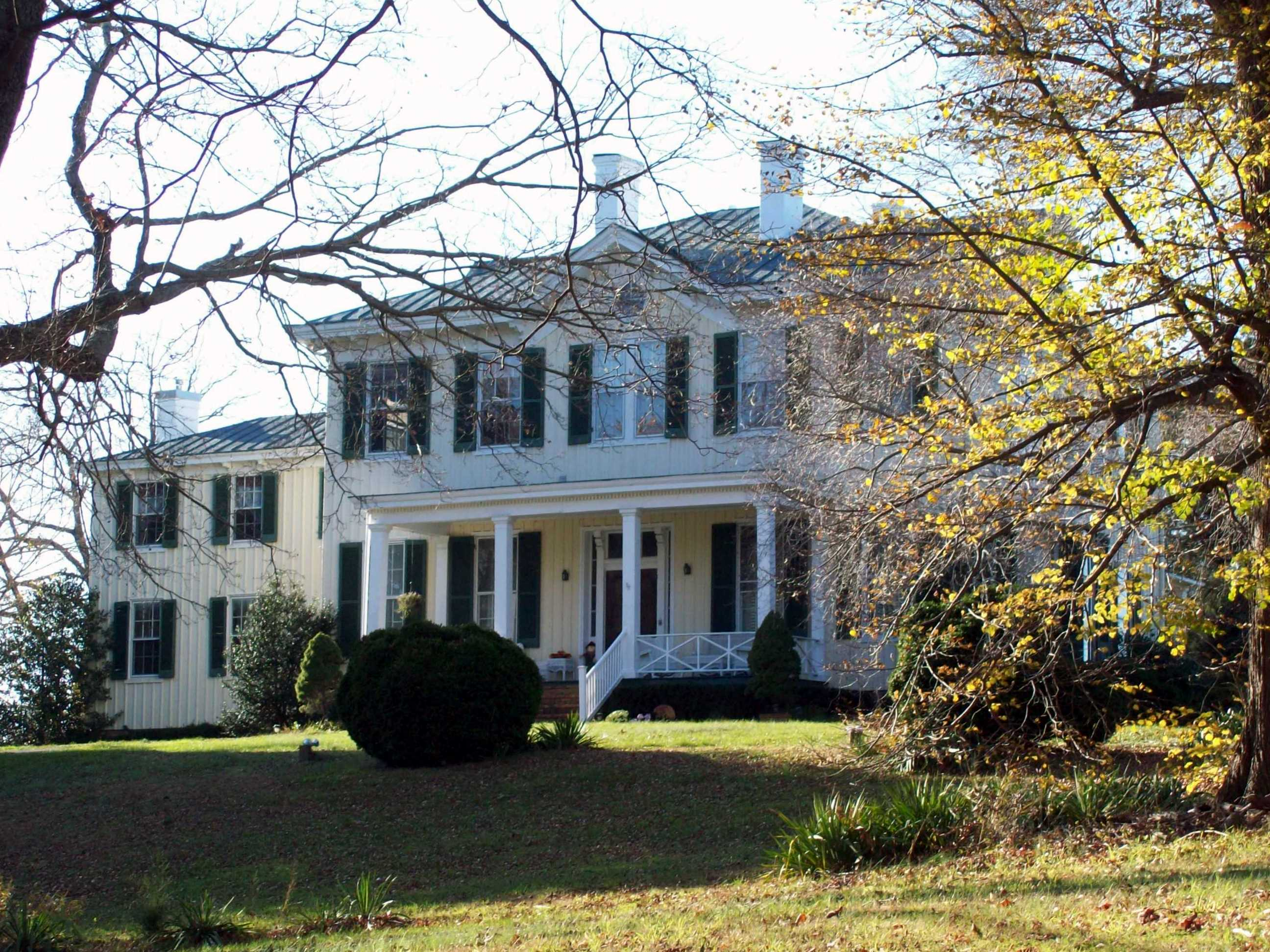
- Waverly, November 2011

- Location within Maryland Location within the United States
- Location: 8901 Duvall Road, Croom, Maryland
- Coordinates: 38°45′59″N 76°44′14″W
- Built: 1855
- Architectural style: Italianate
- NRHP reference No.: 87000800
- Added to NRHP: June 2, 1987

Waverly is a historic home located at Croom in Prince George's County, Maryland. The house, constructed in 1855, is a 2 1/2-story, two-part Italianate-style frame house. The casing of the principal entrance is a combination of both the Greek Revival and Italianate styles. Also on the property are two of the original outbuildings, a meathouse and a washhouse.

It was listed on the National Register of Historic Places in 1987.
