= John W. Coffren House and Store =

Historic house in Maryland, United States

- U.S. National Register of Historic Places
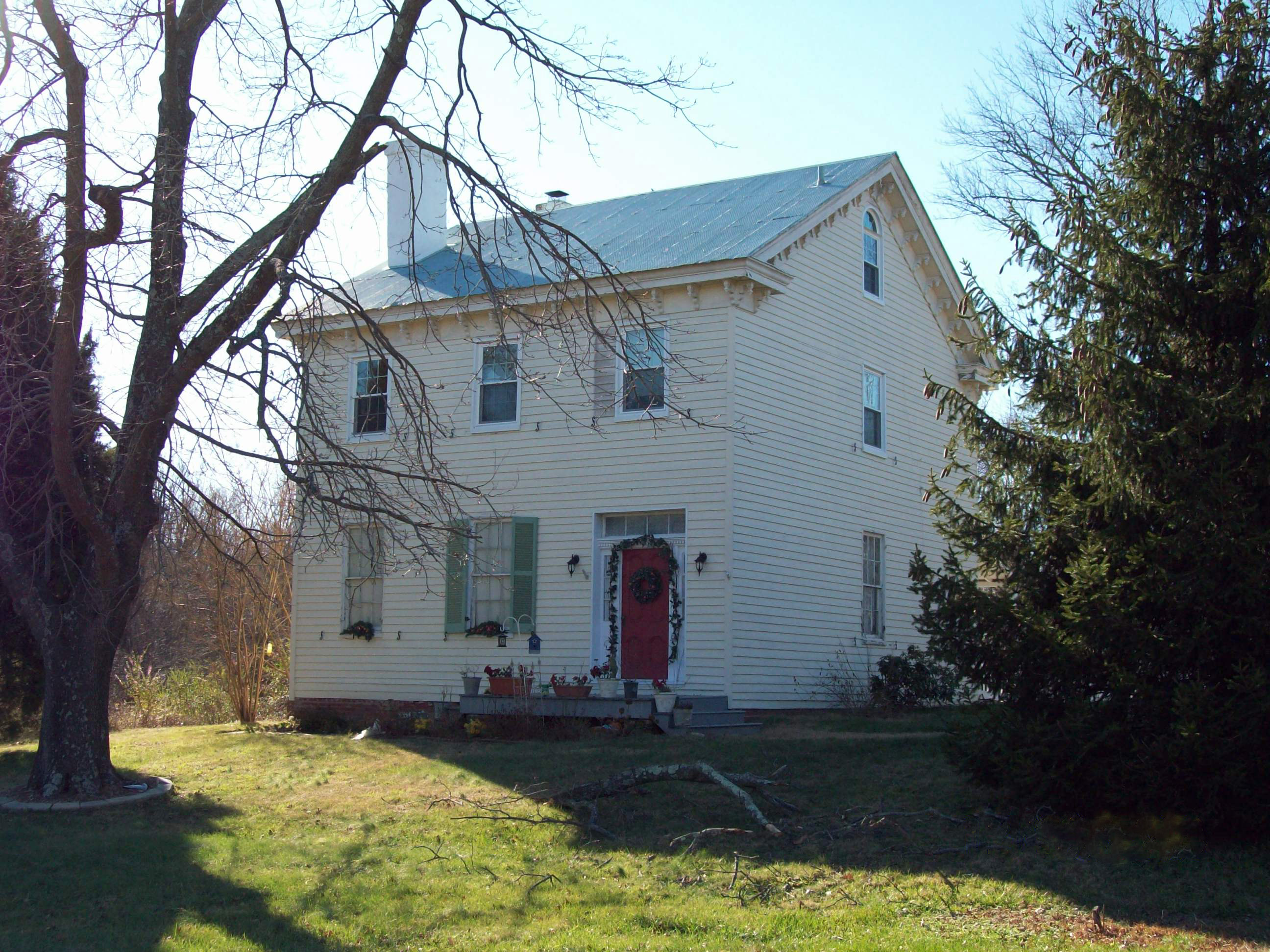
- John W. Coffren House, December 2008

- Location within Maryland Location within the United States
- Location: 10007 Croom Rd., Croom, Maryland
- Coordinates: 38°45′4″N 76°45′45″W
- Built: 1853–1861
- NRHP reference No.: 87000768
- Added to NRHP: June 2, 1987

The John W. Coffren House and Store are two historic buildings located at Croom in Prince George's County, Maryland. This assemblage is significant for their architecture, as well as their association with the commercial history of the area and with John W. Coffren, local merchant and landowner. The Coffren House, built in 1861, has a Greek Revival entrance and interior detail. The Coffren Store, constructed ca. 1853, is a utilitarian structure, designed for use as a one-room general store. The store closed in 1945. The significance of the house and store together is that they are an intact example of house and store complexes that served rural communities in the county during the 19th century. Their builder, John W. Coffren (1828-1874), who rose from ditch digger to wealthy merchant, served on the Vestry of St. Thomas Church in Croom and on the Prince George's County School Board, as well as owning much of the property in the Village of Croom.

The complex was listed on the National Register of Historic Places in 1987.

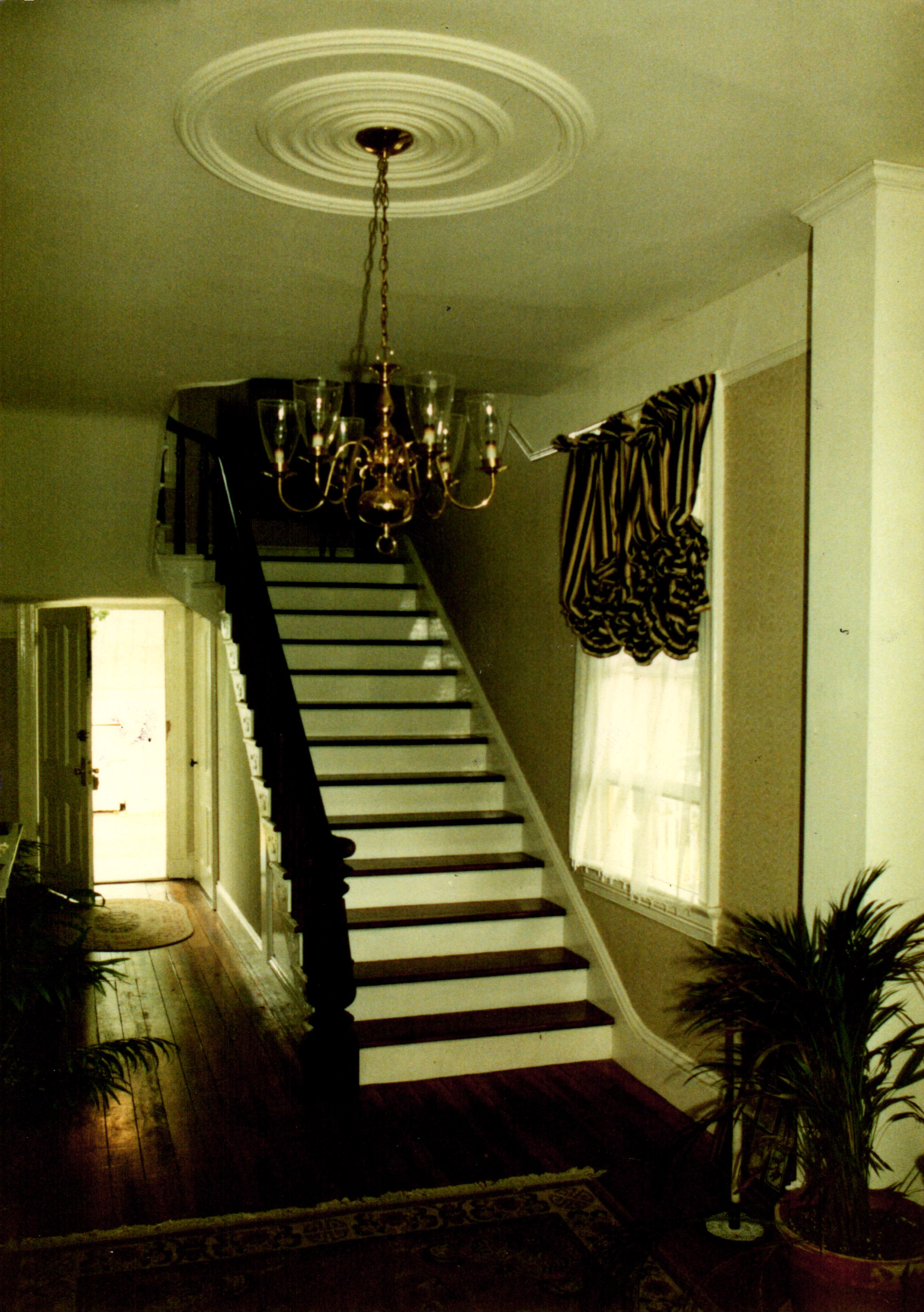
Coffern House Parlor
