= Bank of Brandywine =

Commercial bank founded in Brandywine, Maryland, US

The Bank of Brandywine was established on July 1, 1912 as a commercial bank with a state charter. It was formed from what was previously known as the Southern Maryland German-American Bank.

Its offices were in Brandywine, Maryland and assets totalling $27.4M.

On March 20, 1982, it merged with Citizens Bank and Trust Company of Maryland.
