= Sasscer Tobacco Barn =

Historic tobacco barn in Brandywine, Maryland, US

- Interactive map of the Sasscer Tobacco Barn area

General information
- Location: 13400 Molly Berry Road, Brandywine, Maryland
- Coordinates: 38°42′23.6″N 76°45′56.5″W
- Completed: 1917

Design and construction
- Designations: (see Designated landmark)

The Sasscer Tobacco Barn is a historic tobacco barn in Brandywine, Maryland.
