= Villa DeSales (Aquasco, Maryland) =

Historic house in Maryland, United States

- U.S. National Register of Historic Places
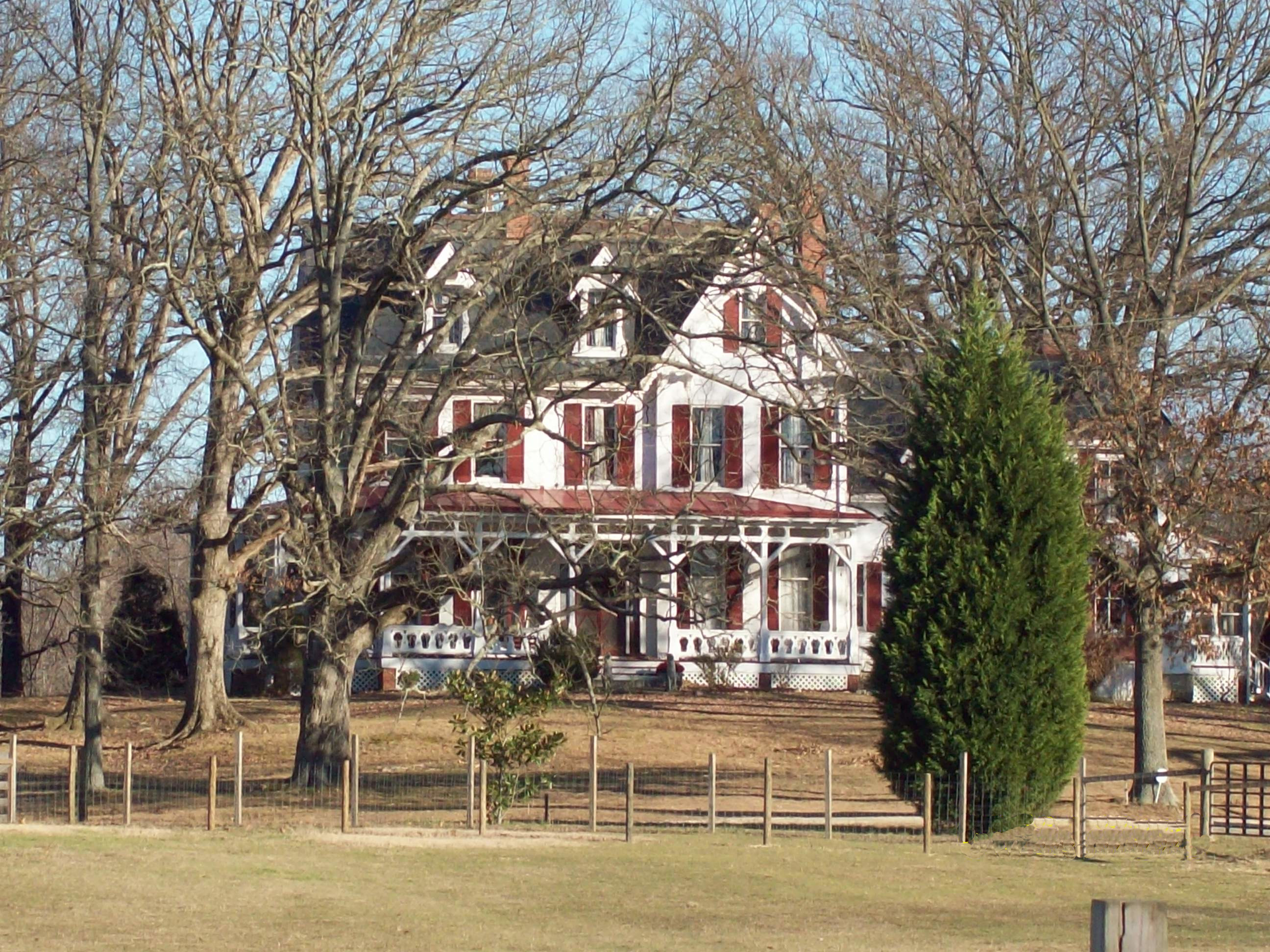
- Villa DeSales, December 2008

- Location within Maryland Location within the United States
- Location: 22410 Aquasco Rd., Aquasco, Maryland
- Coordinates: 38°34′58″N 76°43′19″W
- Built: 1877–78
- Architectural style: Gothic
- NRHP reference No.: 88001063
- Added to NRHP: July 14, 1988

Villa DeSales, built in 1877–1878, is a large five-by-three bay, three-story frame High Victorian Gothic dwelling with a two-story south service wing, located at Aquasco, Prince George's County, Maryland. The historic home is significant for its architectural character which includes a complex of six 19th century outbuildings. This architectural style is an unusual one in Southern Maryland, an area heavily agricultural historically. The large size of the house, the decorative slate roof, amount and variety of cornice and gable trusses, brackets, and pendants; and the well preserved interior with original Gothic Revival-style lighting fixtures and parlor and bedroom furnishings make the house exceptional. In the rear yard are seven domestic and agricultural outbuildings in good condition. The stable is the only High Victorian Gothic barn or stable in Prince George's County.

Villa DeSales was built for George Forbes (1844-1931) and his wife, Fanny Bowling Forbes (1853-1929), near her family home in Aquasco. The Bowling and Forbes families were large landowners in southern Prince George's and neighboring Charles County, Maryland during the 19th century.

Villa DeSales was listed on the National Register of Historic Places in 1988.
