= Lansdale Ghiselin Sasscer =

Politician and United States Army officer (1893-1964)

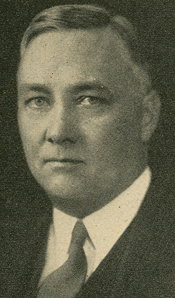
- Lansdale Ghiselin Sasscer

Member of the U.S. House of Representatives from Maryland's 5th district
- In office February 3, 1939 – January 3, 1953
- Preceded by: Stephen W. Gambrill
- Succeeded by: Frank Small, Jr.

Member of the Maryland House of Delegates
- In office 1922–1938

Personal details
- Born: September 30, 1893 Upper Marlboro, Maryland
- Died: November 5, 1964 (aged 71) Upper Marlboro, Maryland
- Party: Democratic
- Spouse: Agnes (Goffren) Sasscer
- Children: Agnes Lansdale "Dolly" Sasscer, Lucy Claggett Sasscer, Lansdale Ghiselin Sasscer, Jr.
- Education: Tome School, Dickinson School of Law

Lansdale Ghiselin Sasscer (September 30, 1893 – November 5, 1964) was an American politician who served as the U.S. representative for Maryland's 5th congressional district for seven terms from 1939 to 1953. He was a member of the Democratic Party.

Sasscer was born in Upper Marlboro, Maryland, and graduated from Dickinson School of Law in Carlisle, Pennsylvania in 1914. He was admitted to the bar the same year and commenced practice in Upper Marlboro. During World War I, he served from 1917 to 1919, being overseas for thirteen months as a first lieutenant in the Fifty-ninth Artillery of the United States Army.

After the War, Sasscer resumed the practice of law, and served as a member of the Maryland State Senate from 1922 to 1938, serving as President of the Senate in 1935 and 1937. He was delegate to the 1924 and 1936 Democratic National Conventions, and vice chairman of the committee on reorganization of the State government in 1939.

Sasscer was elected as a Democrat to the U.S. Congress to fill the vacancy left open as a result of the death of Stephen Gambrill, serving from February 3, 1939, to January 3, 1953. Sasscer chose not to run for re-election in 1952, and instead attempted to win election to the United States Senate seat being vacated by Herbert O'Conor, but lost the nomination to George P. Mahoney. Afterwards, he resumed the practice of law in Upper Marlboro, Maryland.

== Family ==
Sasscer's family has lived in Upper Marlboro since the 1760s.

Sasscer married Agnes Goffren in 1919 and had three children, Agnes Lansdale "Dolly" Sasscer, Lucy Claggett Sasscer and Lansdale Ghiselin Sasscer, Jr.

Sasscer was a resident of Upper Marlboro until his death there in 1964. He is interred in Trinity Episcopal Church Cemetery in Upper Marlboro, Maryland.

Political offices
Preceded by Walter J. Mitchell	President of the Maryland State Senate; 1935–1937	Succeeded by Arthur H. Brice
U.S. House of Representatives
Preceded by Stephen W. Gambrill	Representative of the Fifth Congressional District of Maryland; 1939–1953	Succeeded by Frank Small, Jr.
