= Brandywine, Maryland =

- Census-designated place
- Location of Brandywine, Maryland
- Coordinates: 38°41′55″N 76°50′57″W
- Country: United States
- State: Maryland
- County: Prince George's

Area
  - Total: 21.12 sq mi (54.70 km^{2})
  - Land: 21.04 sq mi (54.49 km^{2})
  - Water: 0.077 sq mi (0.20 km^{2})
- Elevation: 220 ft (67 m)

Population (2020)
  - Total: 10,550
  - Density: 501/sq mi (193.6/km^{2})
- Time zone: UTC−5 (Eastern (EST))
  - Summer (DST): UTC−4 (EDT)
- ZIP code: 20613
- Area codes: 301, 240
- FIPS code: 24-09325
- GNIS feature ID: 0597115
- Website: www.brandywinemd.com

Brandywine is the name of an unincorporated area in Prince George's County, Maryland, United States, that refers both to a census-designated place (CDP) and a zip code area which is much larger (20613), whose areas overlap. The population of Brandywine at the 2020 U.S. census was 10,550 for the CDP, and the population of ZIP code 20613 was 11,860 in 2010.

Brandywine is in the southernmost area of Prince George’s County, surrounded by a rural setting. It is in the Southern Maryland region. Brandywine is also a suburb of two cities: it lies within the outer suburban Washington D.C. area and is also a close suburb of Waldorf.

== Geography ==
The CDP and town are adjacent to the southern border of Prince George's County, lying east and west of busy Maryland Route 5/U.S. Route 301, which merge at Brandywine. Brandywine CDP is bordered by Accokeek to the west, Clinton and Rosaryville to the north, Croom to the northeast, and Cedarville to the southeast, all in Prince George's County. Waldorf in Charles County borders Brandywine to the south. The Brandywine zip code area encompasses parts of both counties and includes Cedarville and Baden.

Designated as part of the Prince George's County rural tier, it is primarily rural with a suburban and commercial center.

== Demographics ==
Historical population
Census	Pop.	Note	%±
2000	1,410		—
2010	6,719		376.5%
2020	10,550		57.0%
U.S. Decennial Census; 2010 2020

=== Racial and ethnic composition ===
Brandywine CDP, Maryland – Racial and ethnic composition Note: the US Census treats Hispanic/Latino as an ethnic category. This table excludes Latinos from the racial categories and assigns them to a separate category. Hispanics/Latinos may be of any race.
Race / Ethnicity (NH = Non-Hispanic)	Pop 2000	Pop 2010	Pop 2020	% 2000	% 2010	% 2020
White alone (NH)	791	1,287	993	56.10%	19.15%	9.41%
Black or African American alone (NH)	539	4,812	8,026	38.23%	71.62%	76.08%
Native American or Alaska Native alone (NH)	16	35	46	1.13%	0.52%	0.44%
Asian alone (NH)	16	138	230	1.13%	2.05%	2.18%
Native Hawaiian or Pacific Islander alone (NH)	1	1	3	0.07%	0.01%	0.03%
Other race alone (NH)	0	4	48	0.00%	0.06%	0.45%
Mixed race or Multiracial (NH)	37	147	465	2.62%	2.19%	4.41%
Hispanic or Latino (any race)	10	295	739	0.71%	4.39%	7.00%
Total	1,410	6,719	10,550	100.00%	100.00%	100.00%

=== 2020 census ===
As of the 2020 census, Brandywine had a population of 10,550. The median age was 39.6 years. 23.3% of residents were under the age of 18 and 11.0% of residents were 65 years of age or older. For every 100 females, there were 90.7 males, and for every 100 females age 18 and over there were 88.4 males age 18 and over.

60.9% of residents lived in urban areas, while 39.1% lived in rural areas.

There were 3,503 households in Brandywine, of which 38.1% had children under the age of 18 living in them. Of all households, 53.4% were married-couple households, 15.0% were households with a male householder and no spouse or partner present, and 26.4% were households with a female householder and no spouse or partner present. About 17.5% of all households were made up of individuals and 4.6% had someone living alone who was 65 years of age or older.

There were 3,629 housing units, of which 3.5% were vacant. The homeowner vacancy rate was 1.4% and the rental vacancy rate was 1.6%.

=== 2000 census ===
As of the census of 2000, there were 1,410 people, 478 households, and 377 families residing in the CDP. The population density was 320.4 inhabitants per square mile (123.7/km^{2}). There were 501 housing units at an average density of 113.8 per square mile (43.9/km^{2}). The racial makeup of the CDP was 56.24% White, 38.23% African American, 1.13% Native American, 1.13% Asian, 0.07% Pacific Islander, 0.57% from other races, and 2.62% from two or more races. Hispanic or Latino of any race were 0.71% of the population.

There were 478 households, out of which 34.9% had children under the age of 18 living with them, 60.9% were married couples living together, 12.3% had a female householder with no husband present, and 21.1% were non-families. 16.3% of all households were made up of individuals, and 6.7% had someone living alone who was 65 years of age or older. The average household size was 2.95 and the average family size was 3.29.

In the CDP, the population was spread out, with 25.7% under the age of 18, 6.6% from 18 to 24, 30.7% from 25 to 44, 25.7% from 45 to 64, and 11.3% who were 65 years of age or older. The median age was 39 years. For every 100 females, there were 90.8 males. For every 100 females age 18 and over, there were 86.1 males.

The median income for a household in the CDP was $57,063, and the median income for a family was $64,038. Males had a median income of $41,783 versus $35,242 for females. The per capita income for the CDP was $19,035. About 8.6% of families and 10.1% of the population were below the poverty line, including 8.3% of those under age 18 and 17.0% of those age 65 or over.

== History ==
William H. Early named the town of Brandywine as property he owned in the mid-19th century. The CDP consists of the property he owned in the 19th century. It is thought to be named after the Battle of Brandywine of the American Revolutionary War. Brandywine was developed on the Baltimore and Potomac Railroad's Pope Creek (Southern Maryland) line in about 1873 and was the only town on the route that developed into a railroad town.

On September 1, 1877, around 4 p.m., a small 2.7 magnitude earthquake struck Brandywine.

In 1912, the Bank of Brandywine was chartered from what had previously been the Southern Maryland German-American Bank.

Although located between the substantial bedroom cities of Clinton and Waldorf, Brandywine remained rural until after the turn of the twenty-first century, when shopping centers—including big-box stores—and small residential developments were built. Despite the building of both a major highway overpass and a roundabout in 2019, the community is still notorious for traffic slowdowns due to both daily local commuters and interstate travelers. As of 2024, two new townhouse developments are under construction.

=== Historical sites ===
The following is a list of historic sites in Brandywine, which includes Baden and T.B. identified by the Maryland-National Capital Park and Planning Commission, none of which are currently museums:

	Site Name	Image	Location	M-NCPPC Inventory Number	Comment
1	Black Swamp School		19011 Croom Road	87A-057	Designated in 2009; Officially 1899 "Colored School No. 2, District 8" in Horsehead
2	Black Walnut Thicket		15508 Letcher Road East	86B-010	Located at Baden; 1856 plantation house, extensively altered in 1930s
3	Chapel of the Incarnation		14070 Brandywine Road	85A-032-27	Listed on the National Register of Historic Places, 2000-12-13
4	Charles S. Early House		14280 Brandywine Road	85B-010	1870, 2-story, gable roof farmhouse
5	William W. Early House		13907 Cherry Tree Crossing Road	85A-032-09	Listed on the National Register of Historic Places, as of 1988-06-30; privately owned
6	Gibbons Methodist Episcopal Church Site and Educational Building		14107 Gibbons Church Road	86B-1	
7	Gwynn Park Manor		7911 Dyson Road	85A-013	Located at T.B.
8	Kalmia (Kalaird)		15110 Nelson Perrie Road	86B-009	Located at Baden
9	Marlow-Huntt Store and Casket Shop		13700 and 13702 Old Brandywine Road	85A-033-14	Located at T.B.
10	Old Bank of Brandywine		14110 Brandywine Road	85A-032-30	
11	Poplar Hill School		19104 Croom Road	87A-12	Located at Baden
12	Rosemount (Skinner-Martin House)		13201 Martin Road	86B-002	
13	St. Paul's Parish Church		SE of Brandywine off MD 381	86B-014	Located at Baden. Listed on the National Register of Historic Places, 1977-09-15
14	St. Thomas Methodist Episcopal Church		18810 Aquasco Road	87A-10	Located at Baden
15	T.B. School		14000 Crain Highway	85A-26	
15	United-Bethel African Methodist Episcopal Church		6810 Floral Park Road	85A-018	
17	William H. Townshend House		12804 Windbrook Drive	81B-007	
18	Sasscer Tobacco Barn		13400 Molly Berry Road	86B-038	

== Enterprises and recreation ==
The Brandywine community includes Gwynn Park High School, several well-known automobile salvage lots, a construction equipment vehicle sales lot, and a large furniture warehouse. A large commercial center was created with the development of Brandywine Crossing shopping center's opening in October 2008 and growing to 800,000 SF with 49 commercial spaces as of 2016. The community's new Southern Area Aquatics and Recreational Complex offers services to residents of all ages.

== Government ==
Prince George's County Police Department District 5 Station in Clinton and District 7 Station in Fort Washington serve the community.

The U.S. Postal Service operates the Brandywine Post Office.

A United States Armed Forces communications receiving facility, known as the Brandywine Receiver Site, is located in Brandywine. It is associated with Joint Base Andrews.

== Education ==
Brandywine residents are assigned to schools in Prince George's County Public Schools.

Residential areas of the CDP area are zoned to Brandywine Elementary School, Gwynn Park Middle School, and Gwynn Park High School.

== Notable people ==
- Jerry Hill, NASCAR driver
- Donnie Neuenberger, NASCAR driver
- People from Brandywine

== See also ==
- Brandywine people
