= Croom, Maryland =

Croom
- Census-designated place
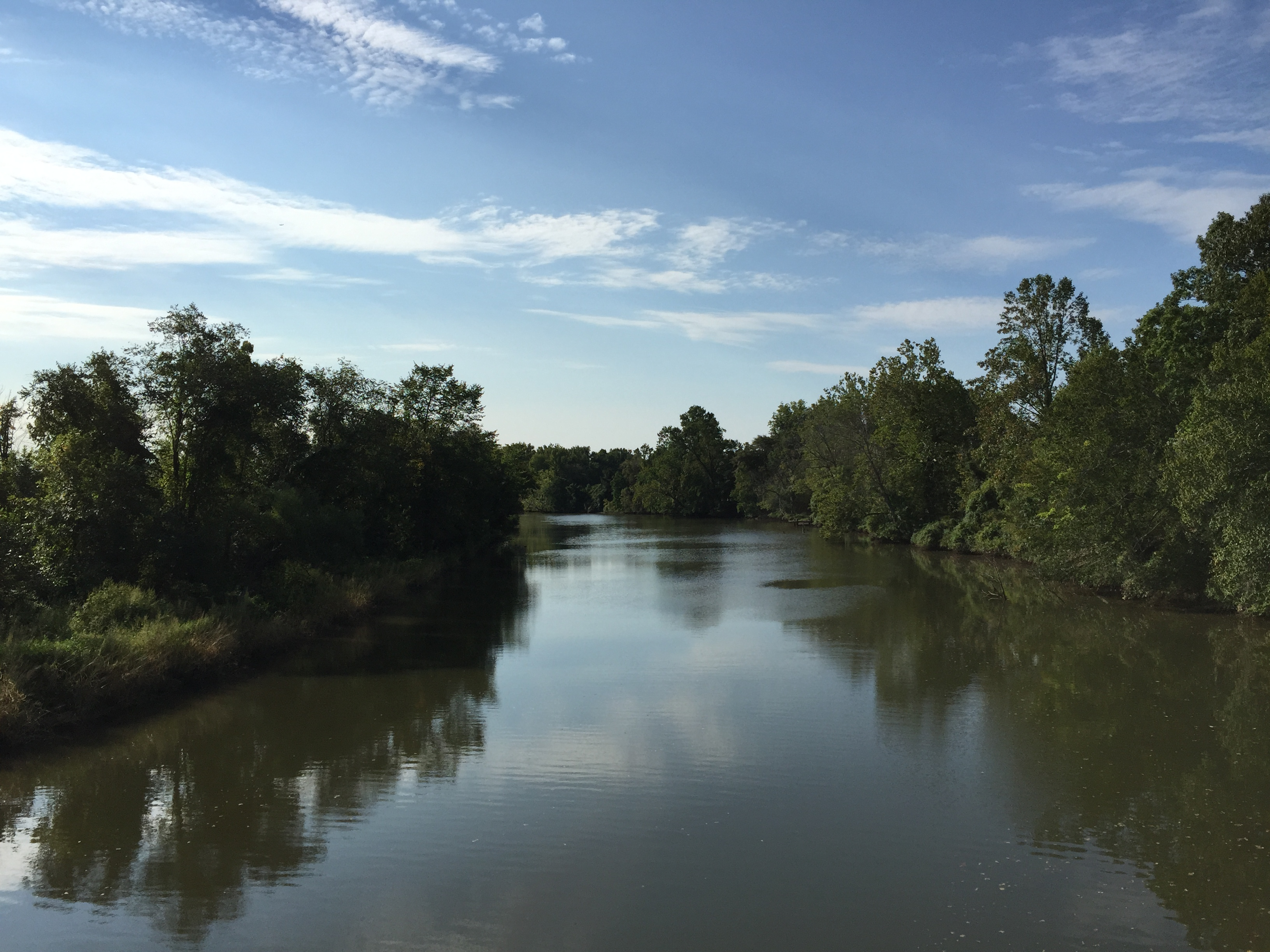
- The Patuxent River forms the eastern boundary of Croom

- Location within the state of Maryland Croom (the United States)
- Coordinates: 38°45′9″N 76°45′50″W
- Country: United States
- State: Maryland
- County: Prince George's

Area
  - Total: 35.41 sq mi (91.70 km^{2})
  - Land: 34.19 sq mi (88.56 km^{2})
  - Water: 1.21 sq mi (3.14 km^{2})

Population (2020)
  - Total: 2,720
  - Density: 79.5/sq mi (30.71/km^{2})
- Time zone: UTC−5 (Eastern (EST))
  - Summer (DST): UTC−4 (EDT)
- FIPS code: 24-20925
- GNIS feature ID: 597296

Croom is an unincorporated community and census-designated place in Southern Prince George's County, Maryland, United States. As of the 2020 census it had a population of 2,720. Croom largely consists of former tobacco farms and forests converted to Washington bedroom subdivisions such as nearby Marlton. The main part of Patuxent River Park (Jug Bay Natural Area) is located in Croom.

== History ==
The community was patented in 1671 as Croome by Christopher Rousby; it was named for the manor of Croom, near Sledmere in the East Riding of Yorkshire. In August 1814, British forces marched through Croom on their way to the Burning of Washington in the War of 1812.

St. Thomas' Episcopal Church dates to colonial times and was listed on the NRHP in 2000. Other buildings on the National Register of Historic Places located at Croom are the John W. Coffren House and Store, Bellefields, Brookefield of the Berrys, Mattaponi (John Bowie Jr. House), St. Thomas' Episcopal Parish Historic District, and Waverly.

The Columbia Air Center was located in Croom from 1941-1956. It was among the first African-American owned airports in the United States.

== Geography ==
According to the United States Census Bureau, Croom has a total area of 35.4 square miles (91.7 km^{2}), of which 34.2 square miles (88.6 km^{2}) is land and 1.2 square miles (3.1 km^{2}), or 3.43%, is water.

== Demographics ==
Historical population
Census	Pop.	Note	%±
2010	2,631		—
2020	2,720		3.4%
U.S. Decennial Census; 2010 2020

Croom first appeared as a census designated place in the 2010 U.S. census formed out of part of deleted Greater Upper Marlboro CDP and additional area.

=== Racial and ethnic composition ===
Croom CDP, Maryland – Racial and ethnic composition Note: the US Census treats Hispanic/Latino as an ethnic category. This table excludes Latinos from the racial categories and assigns them to a separate category. Hispanics/Latinos may be of any race.
Race / Ethnicity (NH = Non-Hispanic)	Pop 2010	Pop 2020	% 2010	% 2020
White alone (NH)	1,321	1,089	50.21%	40.04%
Black or African American alone (NH)	1,068	1,126	40.59%	41.40%
Native American or Alaska Native alone (NH)	16	11	0.61%	0.40%
Asian alone (NH)	35	30	1.33%	1.10%
Native Hawaiian or Pacific Islander alone (NH)	1	1	0.04%	0.04%
Other race alone (NH)	16	29	0.61%	1.07%
Mixed race or Multiracial (NH)	64	160	2.43%	5.88%
Hispanic or Latino (any race)	110	274	4.18%	10.07%
Total	2,631	2,720	100.00%	100.00%

=== 2020 census ===
As of the 2020 census, Croom had a population of 2,720. The median age was 50.8 years. 16.6% of residents were under the age of 18 and 22.6% of residents were 65 years of age or older. For every 100 females there were 100.0 males, and for every 100 females age 18 and over there were 95.9 males age 18 and over.

1.7% of residents lived in urban areas, while 98.3% lived in rural areas.

There were 1,011 households in Croom, of which 25.5% had children under the age of 18 living in them. Of all households, 54.8% were married-couple households, 17.3% were households with a male householder and no spouse or partner present, and 23.1% were households with a female householder and no spouse or partner present. About 22.1% of all households were made up of individuals and 9.3% had someone living alone who was 65 years of age or older.

There were 1,063 housing units, of which 4.9% were vacant. The homeowner vacancy rate was 0.8% and the rental vacancy rate was 0.0%.

== Government ==
Prince George's County Police Department District 5 Station in Clinton CDP serves the community.

== Education ==
Prince George's County Public Schools operates public schools serving the census-designated place.

Elementary schools serving sections of Croom are Baden, Brandywine, Marlton, Mattaponi, and Patuxent. Most areas are zoned to Gwynn Park Middle School, with some zoned to James Madison Middle School and Kettering Middle School. Most areas are zoned to Frederick Douglass High School in Croom, with some areas to the north zoned to Dr. Henry A Wise, Jr. High School and some to the south zoned to Gwynn Park High School.

== Notable people ==
- William Duckett Bowie (1803–1873), politician
- Robert Bowie, governor of Maryland (1750–1818)
- William Williams (c. 1793–1814), an escaped slave who enlisted in United States Infantry Branch and died from his wounds after the British bombardment of Fort McHenry in the War of 1812.
