= National Register of Historic Places listings in Prince George's County, Maryland =

Location of Prince George's County in Maryland

This is a list of the National Register of Historic Places listings in Prince George's County, Maryland.

This is intended to be a complete list of the properties and districts on the National Register of Historic Places in Prince George's County, Maryland, United States. Latitude and longitude coordinates are provided for many National Register properties and districts; these locations may be seen together in a map.

There are 111 properties and districts listed on the National Register in the county, including 6 National Historic Landmarks.

Contents: Counties in Maryland
Allegany - Anne Arundel - Baltimore (city) - Baltimore County - Calvert - Caroline - Carroll - Cecil - Charles - Dorchester - Frederick - Garrett - Harford - Howard - Kent - Montgomery - Prince George's - Queen Anne's - Somerset - St. Mary's - Talbot - Washington - Wicomico - Worcester

This National Park Service list is complete through NPS recent listings posted November 6, 2026.

== Current listings ==
	Name on the Register	Image	Date listed	Location	City or town	Description
1	Abraham Hall	Abraham Hall	March 14, 2005 (#05000146)	7612 Old Muirkirk Rd. 39°03′40″N 76°52′24″W	Beltsville	Former lodge hall and school constructed in 1889; part of the Multiple Property Submission for the African-American Historic Resources of Prince George's County, Maryland.
2	Accokeek Creek Site	Accokeek Creek Site	October 15, 1966 (#66000909)	Address Restricted	Accokeek	Site of a palisaded village that was occupied from ca. A.D. 1300 to ca. 1630.
3	Ammendale Normal Institute	Ammendale Normal Institute	April 14, 1975 (#75002081)	Junction of Ammendale Rd. and U.S. Route 1; 39°03′08″N 76°54′05″W	Beltsville	Former school and novitiate operated by the Congregation of Christian Brothers.
4	Ash Hill	Ash Hill	September 16, 1977 (#77001523)	3308 Rosemary Lane; 38°58′49″N 76°57′34″W	Hyattsville	Two-story brick dwelling erected ca. 1840.
5	Ashland	Ashland	September 15, 1994 (#94001155)	16109 Marlboro Pike; 38°49′01″N 76°43′44″W	Upper Marlboro	Victorian Italianate style home built in 1866-1867.
6	Avondale Mill	Avondale Mill	September 20, 1979 (#79003267)	21 Avondale St. 39°06′25″N 76°50′46″W	Laurel	Site of former grist mill complex.
7	Baltimore-Washington Parkway	Baltimore-Washington Parkway	May 9, 1991 (#91000532)	DC border near the Anacostia R., northeast to just below Jessup Rd. (Maryland Route 175); 39°00′56″N 76°51′46″W	Cheverly to Baltimore	Part of the Multiple Property Submission for the Parkways of the National Capital Region.
8	Beall's Pleasure	Beall's Pleasure	May 4, 1979 (#79003169)	Southeast of Landover at 7250 Old Landover Rd. 38°55′51″N 76°53′10″W	Landover	Federal brick house constructed ca. 1795.
9	Belair	Belair	September 16, 1977 (#77001520)	Tulip Grove and Belair Drives; 38°57′57″N 76°44′50″W	Bowie	Georgian plantation home of the Provincial Governor of Maryland, Samuel Ogle built in about 1745; now museum.
10	Belair Stables	Belair Stables	May 8, 1973 (#73002163)	Belair Dr. 38°57′59″N 76°44′37″W	Bowie	U-shaped sandstone stable was built in 1907; now museum.
11	Bellefields	Bellefields	September 10, 1971 (#71001027)	13104 Duley Station Road; 38°44′45″N 76°46′38″W	Croom	Georgian style manor house constructed about 1720.
12	Bellevue	Bellevue	August 21, 1986 (#86001738)	315 Farmhouse Road (formerly 200 Manning Road East); 38°39′41″N 77°00′05″W	Accokeek	Greek Revival style home constructed about 1840.
13	Bladensburg Battlefield		February 3, 2025 (#100011428)	Address Restricted	Bladensburg vicinity	Encompasses part of the battlefield of the 1812 Battle of Bladensburg.
14	Bostwick	Bostwick	August 19, 1975 (#75002082)	3901 48th St. 38°56′16″N 76°56′05″W	Bladensburg	Brick dwelling built in 1746; home of Benjamin Stoddert, first Secretary of the Navy.
15	Bowie Railroad Buildings	Bowie Railroad Buildings	November 4, 1998 (#98001261)	8614 Chestnut Ave. 39°00′26″N 76°46′46″W	Bowie	Railroad depot complex for the Pennsylvania Railroad at the junction of the Washington (Amtrak/MARC Train) and the Pope's Creek branches; now Huntington Railroad Museum.
16	Bowieville	Bowieville	March 14, 1973 (#73002167)	522 Church Rd., S. 38°53′07″N 76°45′08″W	Upper Marlboro	Federal style plantation house built 1819-20.
17	Bowling Heights	Bowling Heights	November 30, 1982 (#82001599)	3610 Old Crain Highway; 38°50′22″N 76°43′31″W	Upper Marlboro	High Victorian Gothic style dwelling constructed in 1877.
18	Broad Creek Historic District	Broad Creek Historic District	December 8, 2011 (#11000881)	Bounded by Oxon Hill Rd., MD 210, Livingston Rd. & the Potomac River; 38°45′28″N 76°59′49″W	Fort Washington vicinity	
19	Brookefield of the Berrys		June 25, 1987 (#87001032)	12510 Molly Berry Rd. 38°43′04″N 76°45′13″W	Croom	Greek Revival style house finished in 1840.
20	Buck House	Buck House	April 20, 1978 (#78003118)	Main St. 38°49′10″N 76°44′34″W	Upper Marlboro	Brick dwelling built ca. 1742; now a house museum, known as Darnall's Chance
21	Butler House	Butler House	March 14, 2005 (#05000147)	6403 Oxon Hill Rd. 38°48′24″N 77°00′13″W	Oxon Hill	Dwelling constructed in 1853; part of the Multiple Property Submission for the African-American Historic Resources of Prince George's County, Maryland
22	Thomas J. Calloway House	Thomas J. Calloway House	March 14, 2005 (#05000148)	9949 Elm St. 38°57′52″N 76°49′11″W	Lanham	Dwelling constructed in 1910; part of the Multiple Property Submission for the African-American Historic Resources of Prince George's County, Maryland
23	Calvert Hills Historic District	Calvert Hills Historic District	December 23, 2002 (#02001605)	Roughly bounded by Calvert Rd., Bowdoin Ave., Erskine Rd., Calvert Park, Albion Rd., and Baltimore Ave. 38°58′28″N 76°56′05″W	College Park	Middle-class, single-family residential neighborhood developed in the early part of the 20th century.
24	Cedar Haven Historic District		July 1, 2026 (#100013190)	22907-23110 Crispus Attucks Blvd; 23118 Bethune Ave; 18402 Trueman Point Rd; 22904-23100 Paul Dunbar Ave; 18101-18410 Richard Allen St; 22801-23200 Benjamin Banneker Blvd; 22901-23007 Frederick Douglas Ave; 22801-22815 Booker Washington Ave; 23305-23013 C 38°34′29″N 76°41′15″W	Aquasco	
25	Chapel of the Incarnation	Chapel of the Incarnation	December 13, 2000 (#00001505)	14070 Brandywine Rd. 38°41′51″N 76°51′10″W	Brandywine	Mission style church built 1916-1917.
26	Cheverly Historic District	Cheverly Historic District	July 5, 2024 (#100010470)	The district is defined by the first 11 platted sections of the town, roughly bounded by Landover Road to the north, 63rd and 64th Avenues to the east, Reed Street to the south, and Crest Avenue and Tremont Avenue to the west, with houses on both side 38°55′44″N 76°54′40″W	Cheverly	
27	Civil War Fort Sites	Civil War Fort Sites	July 15, 1974 (#74000274)	Arc of sites surrounding central Washington in Maryland, Virginia, and D.C. 38°46′00″N 77°01′40″W	National Harbor	At the outset of the Civil War in 1861, Washington became a critical target for rebel attacks but was virtually without protection. The Union Army hastily began construction of a fortified defense line around the city, the physical remnants of which encompass these 19 earthwork forts, including Fort Foote. See also National Register listings in central D.C., western NW D.C., upper NW D.C., NE D.C., SE D.C., and Fairfax County, Virginia.
28	Clagett House at Cool Spring Manor	Clagett House at Cool Spring Manor	June 3, 2011 (#11000322)	17500 Clagett Landing Rd. 38°52′23″N 76°41′53″W	Upper Marlboro	Greek Revival house built ca. 1830
29	John W. Coffren House and Store	John W. Coffren House and Store	June 2, 1987 (#87000768)	10007 Croom Rd. 38°45′04″N 76°45′45″W	Croom	Dwelling built in 1861, and one room store constructed ca. 1853.
30	College Heights Estates Historic District	College Heights Estates Historic District	December 12, 2012 (#12001023)	Roughly bounded by Adelphi Rd., U. of Maryland College Park, University Park, Van Buren St., Wells Pkwy. 38°58′38″N 76°57′02″W	University Park	
31	College Park Airport	College Park Airport	September 23, 1977 (#77001522)	East of College Park off Kenilworth Ave. 38°58′50″N 76°55′27″W	College Park	Established in 1909; world's oldest continuously operated airport.
32	Compton Bassett	Compton Bassett	March 8, 1983 (#83002959)	16508 Marlboro Pike; 38°48′55″N 76°43′01″W	Upper Marlboro	Brick Georgian house built about 1783.
33	Concord	Concord	May 12, 1982 (#82004681)	8000 Walker Mill Rd. 38°52′39″N 76°52′02″W	District Heights	Greek Revival-influenced dwelling built originally in the 1790s.
34	Content	Content	September 13, 1978 (#78003119)	14518 Church St. 38°48′54″N 76°45′12″W	Upper Marlboro	Frame structure built in three stages; first section constructed in 1787.
35	The Cottage	The Cottage	July 13, 1989 (#89000769)	11904 Old Marlboro Pike; 38°49′21″N 76°47′55″W	Upper Marlboro	Three-part plantation house built in the 1840s with group of domestic outbuildings.
36	Eagle Harbor Historic District		July 18, 2025 (#100012009)	Roughly bounded by the Patuxent River, Oak Trail, the southern portion of Hawkins Drive, Lincoln Park and Lincoln and Walnut Drives, Trueman Point Road/Eagle Harbor Road, and the northwest boundary with Cedar Haven; 38°34′02″N 76°41′07″W	Eagle Harbor	
37	William W. Early House	William W. Early House	June 30, 1988 (#88000984)	13907 Cherry Tree Crossing Rd. 38°41′53″N 76°50′56″W	Brandywine	Queen Anne Victorian built in 1907 for railroad manager; privately owned.
38	Early Family Historic District	Early Family Historic District	December 12, 2012 (#12001024)	13900-13902-13904 & 13907 Cherry Tree Crossing & 14134 Brandywine Rds. 38°41′53″N 76°50′56″W	Brandywine	
39	Fairmount Heights Historic District	Fairmount Heights Historic District	November 18, 2011 (#11000821)	56th Ave., Sheriff Rd., Balsamtree Dr., 62nd St. 62nd Pl., Eastern Ave. 38°54′03″N 76°54′56″W	Fairmount Heights	Misspelled "Fairmont" in the National Register listing
40	Fort Washington	Fort Washington	October 15, 1966 (#66000965)	Fort Washington Park; 38°42′38″N 77°01′49″W	Fort Washington	Site overlooking the Potomac River, original fort completed in 1809.
41	Glenn Dale Tuberculosis Hospital and Sanatorium	Glenn Dale Tuberculosis Hospital and Sanatorium	November 18, 2011 (#11000822)	5201 Glenn Dale Rd. 38°57′39″N 76°48′48″W	Glenn Dale	
42	Don S. S. Goodloe House	Don S. S. Goodloe House	October 13, 1988 (#88001900)	13809 Laurel - Bowie Rd. 39°00′32″N 76°46′03″W	Bowie	Colonial Revival style dwelling built 1915–16.
43	Greenbelt Historic District	Greenbelt Historic District	November 25, 1980 (#80004331)	Off Maryland Route 193; 39°00′10″N 76°53′28″W	Greenbelt	Preserves the center of one of the few examples of the Garden City Movement in the United States.
44	James Hamilton House		November 10, 1988 (#88002064)	16810 Federal Hill Court; 38°54′30″N 76°42′44″W	Bowie	Late-Victorian frame dwelling constructed in the mid-1870s.
45	Hard Bargain Farm	Hard Bargain Farm	October 8, 2014 (#14000839)	2001 Bryan Point Rd. 38°41′21″N 77°02′41″W	Accokeek	
46	Harmony Hall	Harmony Hall	June 6, 1980 (#80000673)	10511 Livingston Rd. 38°44′45″N 77°00′11″W	Fort Washington	Georgian country house built of red brick during the 18th century.
47	Hazelwood	Hazelwood	April 1, 1999 (#99000422)	18611 Queen Anne Rd. 38°53′42″N 76°40′47″W	Upper Marlboro	Frame dwelling built in three discrete sections over a long period of time; the oldest section built about 1770.
48	William Hilleary House	William Hilleary House	July 20, 1978 (#78003116)	4703 Annapolis Rd. 38°56′20″N 76°56′16″W	Bladensburg	18th-century stone, gambrel-roofed house.
49	Hilltop Manor	Hilltop Manor	December 21, 2007 (#07001288)	4100-4112 and 4200-4214 53rd Ave., 4100-4210 53rd Pl., and 5300-5304 Annapolis Rd. 38°56′33″N 76°55′46″W	Bladensburg	Brick garden apartment buildings constructed in 1942 and 1943.
50	His Lordship's Kindness	His Lordship's Kindness	April 15, 1970 (#70000853)	3.5 miles northwest of Rosaryville off Rosaryville Rd. 38°46′44″N 76°50′34″W	Rosaryville	Georgian mansion, also known as Poplar Hill, built in the 1780s; operated as historic house museum.
51	Hyattsville Armory	Hyattsville Armory	March 27, 1980 (#80004332)	5340 Baltimore Ave. 38°57′17″N 76°56′28″W	Hyattsville	Former National Guard armory built in 1918.
52	Hyattsville Historic District	Hyattsville Historic District	March 25, 1982 (#82004682)	Off U.S. Route 1 Boundary increase (listed December 15, 2004, refnum=04001356): Roughly bounded by Baltimore & Ohio railroad tracks, East-West Highway, 42nd Pl., Madison, 37th and 38th Aves., Hamilton Pl. and 37th Pl. 38°57′08″N 76°56′48″W	Hyattsville	Residential neighborhood that exhibit late-19th and early-20th century design characteristics.
53	Kingston	Kingston	July 21, 1978 (#78003120)	5415 Old Crain Highway; 38°48′52″N 76°45′21″W	Upper Marlboro	Believed to be the oldest building remaining in the town of Upper Marlboro and may have been built, at least in part, before 1730.
54	Langley Park	Langley Park	August 29, 2008 (#08000809)	8151 15th Avenue; 38°59′27″N 76°58′53″W	Langley Park	Georgian Revival style estate mansion built in 1924.
55	Laurel High School	Laurel High School	June 27, 1979 (#79003170)	700 block of Montgomery St. 39°06′25″N 76°51′20″W	Laurel	Original building (not current one) for Laurel High School (Maryland)
56	Laurel Railroad Station	Laurel Railroad Station	March 30, 1973 (#73002165)	E. Main St. 39°06′08″N 76°50′27″W	Laurel	Passenger rail station originally constructed in 1884, for the Baltimore and Ohio Railroad.
57	Marenka House	Marenka House	September 8, 2017 (#100001581)	7300 Radcliffe Dr. 38°58′34″N 76°54′50″W	College Park	
58	Marietta	Marietta	July 25, 1994 (#94000729)	5626 Bell Station Rd. 38°57′56″N 76°47′57″W	Glenn Dale	Federal brick house begun about 1812.
59	Market Master's House	Market Master's House	March 29, 1990 (#90000553)	4006 48th St. 38°56′21″N 76°56′13″W	Bladensburg	An 18th-century vernacular Colonial-era stone dwelling with 20th-century additions.
60	MD 214 over Patuxent River Bridge	MD 214 over Patuxent River Bridge	September 23, 2025 (#100012266)	MD 214 over Patuxent River; 38°54′27″N 76°40′22″W	Davidsonville	Historic Highway Bridges of Maryland, 1694-1965 MPS. Crosses into Anne Arundel County
61	Melford	Melford	April 6, 1988 (#88000271)	17100 block of Melford Boulevard; Science Drive in Maryland Science & Technology Center; 38°57′35″N 76°42′34″W	Bowie	Greek Revival style plantation home built in the 1840s.
62	Melwood Park	Melwood Park	October 8, 1976 (#76002169)	10908 Old Marlboro Pike; 38°48′45″N 76°49′01″W	Upper Marlboro	Brick dwelling believed to have been built by Ignatius Digges (1707-1785) ca. 1750.
63	Montpelier	Montpelier	April 17, 1970 (#70000852)	2.1 miles east of Laurel on Maryland Route 197; 39°03′48″N 76°50′42″W	Laurel	Georgian style home most likely constructed between 1781 and 1785; opened as a public tourist attraction in 1985.
64	Mount Hope	Mount Hope	November 29, 1978 (#78003180)	1 Cheverly Circle; 38°55′20″N 76°54′47″W	Cheverly	Frame house built in two stages; home of Chverly's founder Robert Marshall.
65	Mount Lubentia	Mount Lubentia	July 9, 1987 (#87001033)	603 Largo Rd. 38°52′55″N 76°48′59″W	Largo	Federal-style brick house built about 1798.
66	Mount Pleasant	Mount Pleasant	November 29, 1972 (#72001482)	Mt. Pleasant Rd. 38°50′34″N 76°42′40″W	Upper Marlboro	Georgian dwelling in brick built about 1750.
67	Mount Rainier Historic District	Mount Rainier Historic District	September 7, 1990 (#90001319)	Roughly bounded by Arundel St., 37th St., Bladensburg Rd., and Eastern Ave. 38°56′21″N 76°57′42″W	Mount Rainier	Community of modestly scaled, detached, single-family, frame houses developed ca. 1900-1940.
68	Moyaone Reserve Historic District	Moyaone Reserve Historic District	October 7, 2020 (#100005659)	Roughly bounded by Bryan Point Rd., Piscataway Park, Overlook Dr./Old Landing Rd., and Farmington Rd. West; 38°41′27″N 77°01′25″W	Accokeek	Extends into Charles County.
69	National Archives Archeological Site	National Archives Archeological Site	August 22, 1996 (#96000901)	Address Restricted	College Park	Remains from prehistoric settlements during the Late Archaic period, c. 4000-1500 B.C.
70	New Town Center	New Town Center	October 23, 2018 (#100002683)	6505 & 6525 Belcrest Rd., 3700 East-West Hwy. 38°58′04″N 76°57′10″W	Hyattsville	
71	North Brentwood Historic District	North Brentwood Historic District	November 21, 2003 (#03001174)	Roughly bounded by 39th Pl., Allison St., Rhode Island Ave., and Webster St. 38°56′41″N 76°57′08″W	North Brentwood	Earliest incorporated African American community in the county; working-class suburban community developed 1891-1950.
72	Nottingham Site		May 12, 1975 (#75002083)	Address Restricted	Upper Marlboro	May correspond to the village of Mattpament depicted on John Smith’s 1608 map.
73	O'Dea House	O'Dea House	June 4, 1987 (#87000899)	5804 Ruatan St. 38°59′41″N 76°54′47″W	Berwyn Heights	Queen Anne-style dwelling built in 1888.
74	Old Town College Park	Old Town College Park	December 4, 2012 (#12000993)	Roughly bounded by Yale, & Columbia Aves., Calvert Rd., & UM Campus; 38°58′50″N 76°56′02″W	College Park	
75	Oxon Cove Park	Oxon Cove Park	September 2, 2003 (#03000869)	Government Farm Rd. 38°48′08″N 77°00′28″W	Oxon Hill	Property developed as a plantation, an institutional agricultural complex, and a farm museum.
76	Oxon Hill Manor	Oxon Hill Manor	June 9, 1978 (#78003117)	6701 Oxon Hill Rd. 38°47′47″N 77°00′19″W	Oxon Hill	neo-Georgian house designed in 1928 for Sumner Welles.
77	Peace Cross	Peace Cross	September 8, 2015 (#15000572)	Annapolis Rd. & Baltimore Ave. 38°56′22″N 76°56′27″W	Bladensburg	AKA the World War I memorial
78	Piscataway Park	Piscataway Park	October 15, 1966 (#66000144)	East of the Potomac River and south of Piscataway Creek; 38°41′05″N 77°03′05″W	Accokeek	Location of Marshall Hall and the National Colonial Farm.
79	Piscataway Village Historic District	Piscataway Village Historic District	December 15, 2011 (#11000919)	Bounded by Piscataway Cr., Piscataway Rd. & Livingston Rd. 38°41′47″N 76°58′31″W	Clinton vicinity	
80	Pleasant Hills	Pleasant Hills	August 6, 1980 (#80004334)	7001 Croom Station Rd. 38°47′35″N 76°45′51″W	Upper Marlboro	Brick dwelling with Greek Revival detailing, constructed ca. 1810.
81	Pleasant Prospect	Pleasant Prospect	April 30, 1976 (#76002168)	12806 Woodmore Rd. 38°56′04″N 76°47′00″W	Mitchellville	Brick dwelling built by Isaac Duckett in 1798.
82	Ridgeley School	Ridgeley School	May 1, 2015 (#14001093)	8507 Central Ave. 38°53′20″N 76°51′37″W	Capitol Heights	
83	Ridgley Methodist Episcopal Church	Ridgley Methodist Episcopal Church	March 14, 2005 (#05000149)	8900 Central Ave. 38°53′35″N 76°51′09″W	Landover	One-story frame church constructed in 1921; part of the Multiple Property Submission for the African-American Historic Resources of Prince George's County, Maryland.
84	Riverdale Park Historic District	Riverdale Park Historic District	December 23, 2002 (#02001608)	Roughly bounded by Tuckerman St., Taylor Rd., Oglethorpe St., the B&O railroad tracks, Madison St. and Baltimore Ave. 38°57′59″N 76°56′12″W	Riverdale Park	Early railroad suburb northeast of Washington, D.C. developed starting in 1889.
85	Riversdale	Riversdale	April 11, 1973 (#73002166)	Riverdale Rd. between 18th and Taylor Sts. 38°57′37″N 76°55′55″W	Riverdale Park	Five-part, large-scale late Georgian mansion with Federal interior, built between 1801 and 1807.
86	St. Ignatius Church	St. Ignatius Church	June 27, 1974 (#74002201)	2317 Brinkley Rd. 38°48′16″N 76°58′01″W	Oxon Hill	Catholic parish church constructed between 1890 and 1891.
87	St. John's Church	St. John's Church	April 8, 1974 (#74002202)	9801 Livingston Rd. 38°45′18″N 77°00′04″W	Fort Washington	Oldest church site the county dating to 1692; church structure dates to 1767-1768.
88	St. Mary's Beneficial Society Hall	St. Mary's Beneficial Society Hall	March 14, 2005 (#05000150)	14825 Pratt St. 38°49′11″N 76°44′53″W	Upper Marlboro	Multi-purpose building constructed in 1892; part of the Multiple Property Submission for the African-American Historic Resources of Prince George's County, Maryland.
89	Saint Mary's Rectory	Saint Mary's Rectory	September 10, 1987 (#87001572)	16305 Saint Mary's Church Rd. 38°35′05″N 76°43′22″W	Aquasco	Frame dwelling built in 1849 and enlarged to twice its size in 1856.
90	St. Matthew's Church	St. Matthew's Church	April 10, 1972 (#72001481)	Addison Rd. and 62nd Pl. 38°54′06″N 76°54′34″W	Seat Pleasant	Brick Episcopal church also known as Addison Chapel.
91	St. Paul's Parish Church	St. Paul's Parish Church	September 15, 1977 (#77001521)	13500 Baden Westwood Road off Maryland Route 381; 38°39′40″N 76°46′20″W	Brandywine	Brick Episcopal church dating to 1733.
92	St. Thomas' Church	St. Thomas' Church	December 13, 2000 (#00001504)	14300 St. Thomas Church Rd. 38°44′56″N 76°45′24″W	Upper Marlboro	Brick Episcopal church constructed between 1742 and 1745.
93	St. Thomas' Episcopal Parish Historic District	St. Thomas' Episcopal Parish Historic District	December 30, 2011 (#11000963)	From east side of Croom Rd. along north & south sides of St. Thomas Church Rd., eastward for about 1500 ft. 38°44′51″N 76°45′29″W	Upper Marlboro vicinity	
94	Harry Smith House	Harry Smith House	May 4, 1993 (#93000342)	4707 Oliver St. 38°57′39″N 76°56′01″W	Riverdale Park	Queen Anne-style frame dwelling, built in 1890.
95	Snow Hill	Snow Hill	August 13, 1974 (#74002200)	13301 Laurel-Bowie Road (Maryland 197), Maryland Route 197; 39°04′32″N 76°50′35″W	Laurel	Late Georgian style house built between 1799 and 1801.
96	Spacecraft Magnetic Test Facility	Spacecraft Magnetic Test Facility	October 3, 1985 (#85002811)	Goddard Space Flight Center; 39°00′24″N 76°49′31″W	Greenbelt	Built in 1966 to allow the evaluation of magnetic movement in spacecraft.
97	Suitland Parkway	Suitland Parkway	June 2, 1995 (#95000604)	From the Anacostia River in the District of Columbia to Pennsylvania Ave. in Prince George's County; 38°50′29″N 76°55′17″W	Suitland	Part of the Multiple Property Submission for the Parkways of the National Capital Region.
98	Sunnyside	Sunnyside	May 29, 1987 (#87000840)	16005 Dr. Bowen Rd. 38°35′05″N 76°43′41″W	Aquasco	Frame dwelling dating to 1844.
99	Surratt House	Surratt House	March 30, 1973 (#73002164)	9110 Brandywine Rd. 38°45′53″N 76°53′52″W	Clinton	Home owned by Mary Surratt that served as an arms and ammunition stop for John Wilkes Booth during his flight after shooting Lincoln; now operated as house museum.
100	John H. Traband House	John H. Traband House	March 22, 1984 (#84001856)	14204 Old Marlboro Pike; 38°49′08″N 76°45′32″W	Upper Marlboro	Queen Anne influenced frame structure built between 1895 and 1897.
101	University Park Historic District	University Park Historic District	October 10, 1996 (#96001084)	Bounded by Baltimore Ave., Maryland Route 410, and Adelphi Rd. 38°58′17″N 76°56′36″W	University Park	Middle-class, single-family residential neighborhood developed in the early part of the 20th century.
102	Upper Marlboro Residential Historic District	Upper Marlboro Residential Historic District	December 12, 2012 (#12001026)	Bounded by 14204 Old Marlboro Pike, 14519 Elm & 14508 Main Sts., Western Branch & 5600 Old Crain Hwy. 38°48′56″N 76°45′16″W	Upper Marlboro	
103	US Post Office-Hyattsville Main	US Post Office-Hyattsville Main	July 24, 1986 (#86001906)	4325 Gallatin St. 38°57′10″N 76°56′29″W	Hyattsville	Colonial Revival building constructed in 1935.
104	Villa DeSales	Villa DeSales	July 14, 1988 (#88001063)	22410 Aquasco Rd. 38°34′58″N 76°43′19″W	Aquasco	Frame High Victorian Gothic dwelling built in 1877-1878.
105	George Washington House	George Washington House	August 7, 1974 (#74002198)	Baltimore Ave. at Upshur St. 38°56′28″N 76°56′29″W	Bladensburg	Brick structure constructed in 1732; also known as Indian Queen Tavern.
106	Waverly	Waverly	June 2, 1987 (#87000800)	8901 Duvall Rd. 38°45′59″N 76°44′14″W	Croom	Italianate style frame house constructed in 1855.
107	West Riverdale Historic District	West Riverdale Historic District	December 23, 2002 (#02001609)	Roughly bounded by Maryland Route 410, 44th Place, the Hyattsville city limits, and 43rd St. 38°57′48″N 76°56′31″W	Riverdale Park	Diverse residential community that includes the former Eugene Leland Memorial Hospital.
108	Williams Plains	Williams Plains	November 28, 1980 (#80004329)	Maryland Route 3 in White Marsh Recreational Park; 38°58′35″N 76°43′19″W	Bowie	Early to mid-19th century brick dwelling.
109	Woodstock	Woodstock	September 21, 1987 (#87001573)	8706 SE. Crain Highway; 38°46′10″N 76°48′07″W	Upper Marlboro	Mid-19th century plantation house with decorative elements in the Greek Revival style.
110	Woodyard Archeological Site	Woodyard Archeological Site	December 19, 1974 (#74002199)	Woodyard Rd. 38°47′04″N 76°50′49″W	Clinton	Site of a large brick mansion known as "The Woodyard" and built in the 18th century.
111	Wyoming	Wyoming	January 24, 1980 (#80004330)	South of Clinton on Thrift Rd. 38°43′38″N 76°55′09″W	Clinton	Frame dwelling dating to the 18th century; ancestral home of the Marbury family.

== See also ==
- List of National Historic Landmarks in Maryland
- National Register of Historic Places listings in Maryland
