= Clagett Farm =

Coordinates: 38°49′20″N 76°47′47″W

Clagett Farm, once known as Navajo, is a 285-acre (1.15 km^{2}) working farm located in Upper Marlboro, Maryland. It is owned and operated by the Chesapeake Bay Foundation.

== History ==
Thomas Clagett, of the plantation known as Weston, was one of the largest landholders in the Marlboro area. Thomas Clagett purchased this tract, 822 acres of Bealls Chance, Green Spring, etc., in equity from the representatives of John E. Berry in 1831. Along with additional lands acquired at about the same time, Thomas Clagett created two plantations, The Cottage and Strawberry Hill, totaling approximately 1,000 acres. Thomas conveyed The Cottage to his second son, Charles, at the time of his marriage to Mary Mullikin in 1846.

Charles Clagett produced tobacco, livestock and wool until after the Civil War when he gave up tobacco and focused on livestock production. In addition to farming, Charles Clagett served for twenty years as a judge of the County Orphans Court. Around 1880, the Ingleside and Navajo farms were set aside for two of Charles' sons on the adjoining property. Upon his death in 1894, the farm and The Cottage passed to his younger son, William B. Clagett, whom Charles had previously provided with adjoining property for his home and farm known as Navajo. William continued to reside at Navajo, and Navajo was leased to a tenant farmer.

== 20th century ==
For most of the 20th century, the farm would continue to be leased. Upon the death of William in 1911, Navajo farm passed to his son, Charles, and his daughter, Marguerite. After the death on July 7, 1972 of Charles, who lived and worked in Baltimore as a wealthy lawyer, Navajo was conveyed to the Chesapeake Bay Foundation as a center for environmental education. The 283-acre (115 ha) working farm, formerly known as Navajo, was bequeathed to the Chesapeake Bay Foundation along with $600,000 in 1981 by the estate of Charles Clagett, who made it clear in his will that he wanted the place used for educational purposes.

== Chesapeake Bay Foundation ==
Clagett Farm produces over 60,000 pounds of vegetables (and some fruit) each year. The farm strives to use sustainable techniques in farming. Clagett Farm also stresses the vegetable production plan, From the Ground Up, a joint effort by the Chesapeake Bay Foundation and the Capital Area Food Bank to raise a variety of produce and provide food to people of all income levels. Clagett Farm is noted for distributing free or reduced priced produce for the underserved communities in Washington, D.C. Forty percent is distributed free to non-profit organizations including Melwood Women Shelter and Capital Area Food Bank. The other sixty percent is sold to shareholders in the Community Supported Agriculture program.

== Also see ==
- Clagett House at Cool Spring Manor
