= Early Family Historic District =

Historic district in Maryland, United States

- U.S. National Register of Historic Places
- U.S. Historic district
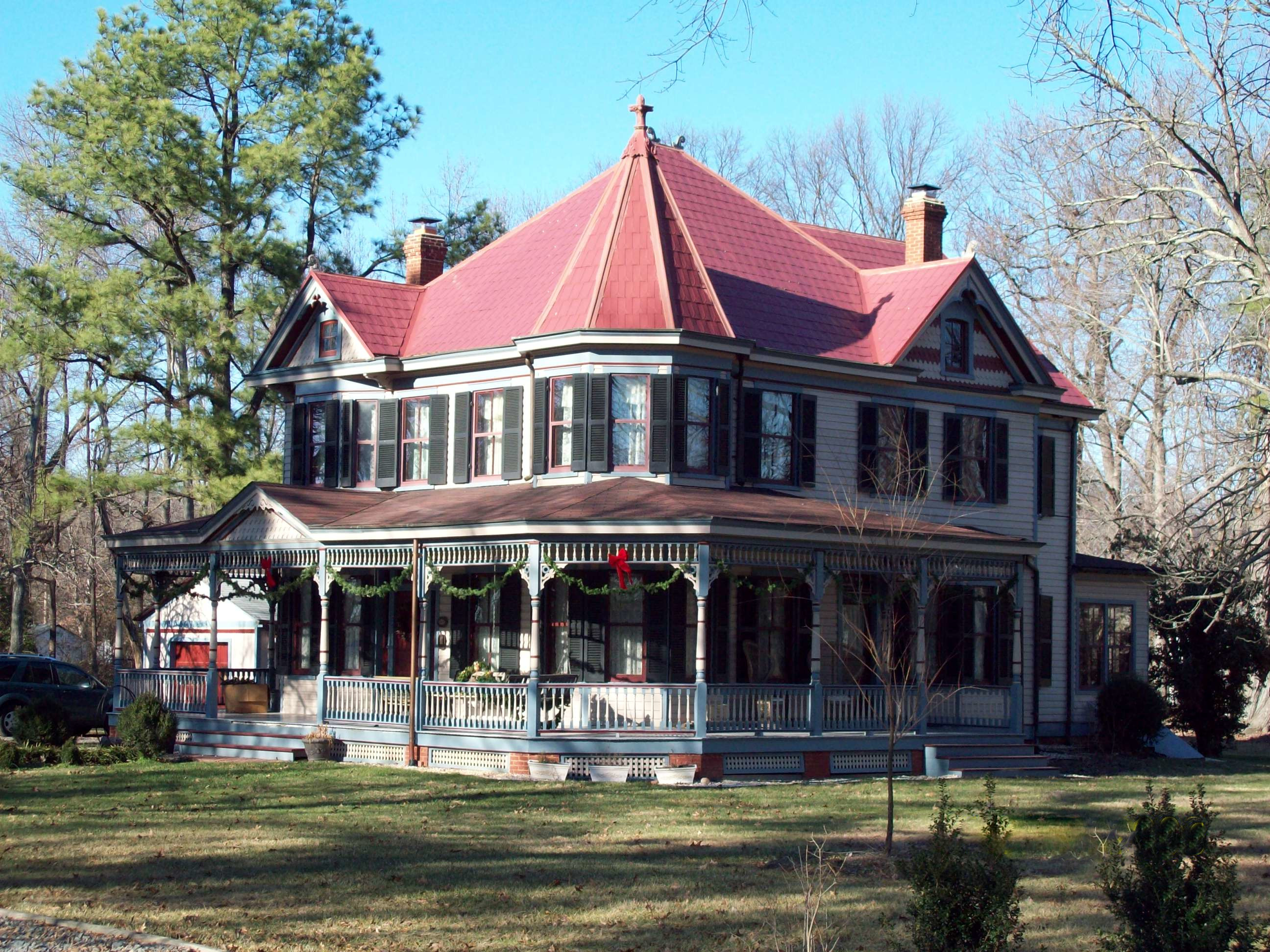
- William W. Early House, 2008

- Location within Maryland Location within the United States
- Location: 13900-13902-13904 & 13907 Cherry Tree Crossing & 14134 Brandywine Rds., Brandywine, Maryland
- Coordinates: 38°41′53″N 76°50′56″W
- Area: 8.234 acres (3.332 ha)
- Built: 1872
- Architectural style: Queen Anne, Colonial Revival
- NRHP reference No.: 12001024
- Added to NRHP: December 12, 2012

The Early Family Historic District is a cluster of five properties in Brandywine, Maryland associated with the Early family, leading developers and promoters of the community in the late 19th century. It includes a store built in 1872, by William H. Early, who platted the township out, the William W. Early House, one of the finest Queen Anne Victorians in the county, and three other Early family residences.

The district was listed on the National Register of Historic Places in 2012.

== See also ==
- National Register of Historic Places listings in Prince George's County, Maryland
