= Harry Smith House (Riverdale Park, Maryland) =

Historic house in Maryland, United States

- U.S. National Register of Historic Places
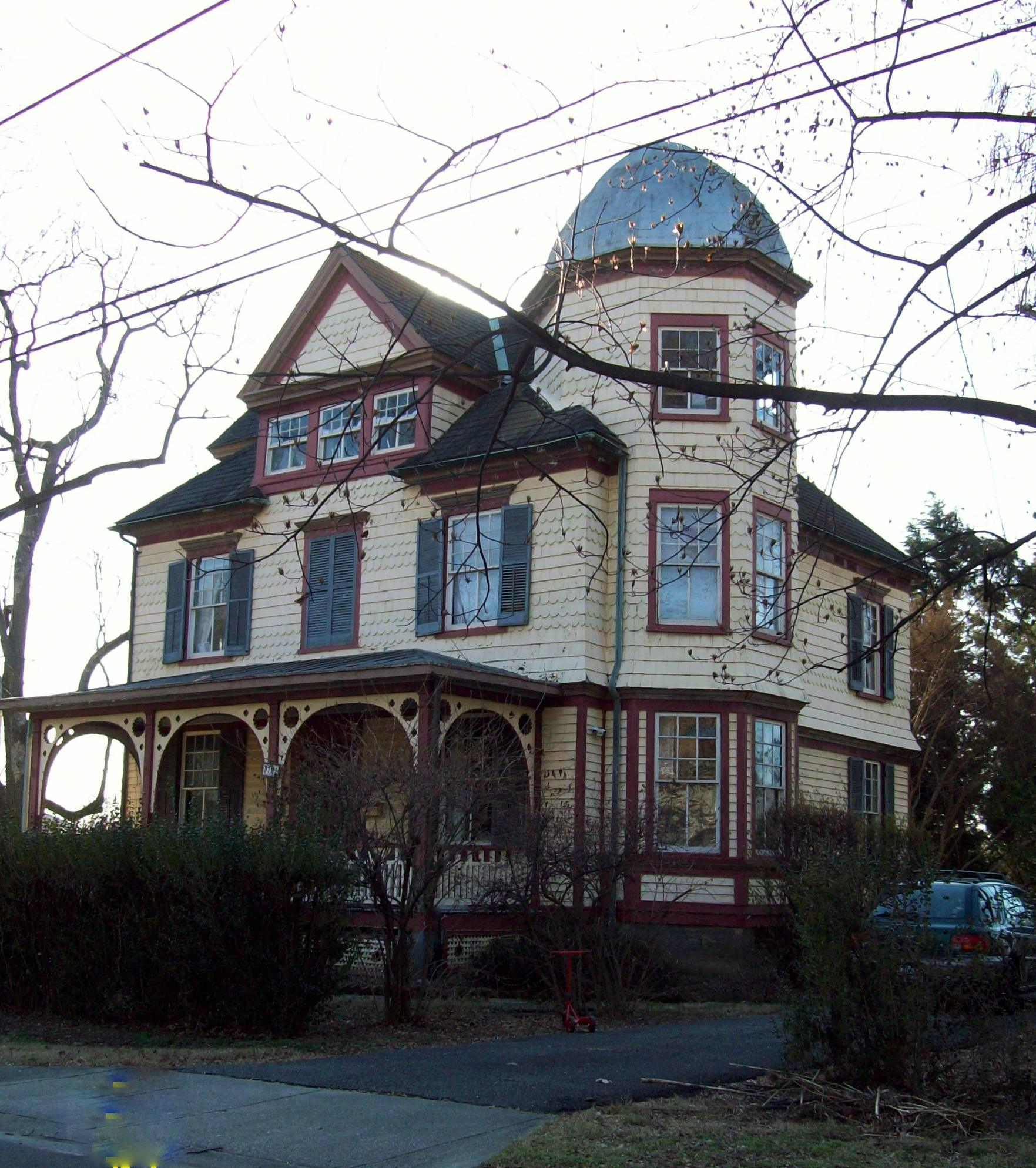
- Harry Smith House, December 2008

- Location within Maryland Location within the United States
- Location: 4707 Oliver St., Riverdale Park, Maryland
- Coordinates: 38°57′39″N 76°56′1″W
- Area: less than one acre
- Built: 1890
- Architectural style: Queen Anne
- NRHP reference No.: 93000342
- Added to NRHP: May 4, 1993

The Harry Smith House is a Queen Anne-style frame dwelling at 4707 Oliver Street in Riverdale Park, Prince George's County, Maryland, located northeast of Washington, D.C. Built in 1890, it stands on one of the original streets platted in the 1889 railroad suburb subdivision of Riverdale Park. The house combines decorative detail characteristic of the Queen Anne style of the 1880s with the foursquare plan that became popular at the turn of the 20th century. It was one of the first dwellings built in the new suburb and served as an elaborate model home intended to stimulate lot sales in the development. The house remained in near-original condition and was the earliest and best-surviving of the original Riverdale Park houses at the time of its listing on the National Register of Historic Places in 1993.

== History ==
=== Riversdale estate and the development of Riverdale Park ===
The land on which the Harry Smith House stands was historically part of the Riversdale plantation. Henri Joseph Stier, a Belgian aristocrat who fled to the United States during the French Revolution, purchased approximately 729 acres (295 ha) near Bladensburg in 1800 and began constructing the Riversdale mansion. After the Stier family returned to Europe in 1803, the estate passed to Stier's daughter Rosalie and her husband George Calvert, a descendant of the Lords Baltimore. The plantation remained in the Calvert family for three generations. Their son, Charles Benedict Calvert, who lived at Riversdale his entire life, died in 1864, and the property was subsequently divided among his heirs.

In 1887, the Calvert heirs sold approximately 474 acres (192 ha) of the estate, including the Riversdale mansion, to New York City businessmen John Fox and Alexander Lutz for $47,000. On March 23, 1889, Fox and Lutz formed the Riverdale Park Company, naming the new community after the mansion at its center. The company planned an upper-middle-class residential suburb for workers commuting to Washington, D.C., and Baltimore. Surveyor D. J. Howell platted the land in 1889, incorporating a grid of streets surrounding the Baltimore & Ohio Railroad station and the Riversdale mansion. Construction of homes began in 1890, and the Riverdale Park Company built model homes, including the Smith House, as an inducement to prospective buyers.

=== The Smith family ===
Harry L. Smith was a middle-class government worker who initially rented the house from the Riverdale Park Company. By 1905, Smith and his wife had saved enough money to purchase the property outright, with the assistance of a loan from the company. The Smiths raised their family in the home. Harry's third son, Alfred H. Smith, went on to found the A. H. Smith Sand and Gravel Company in 1925, building it into one of the largest such firms in the mid-Atlantic region. During the Great Depression, in 1933, Alfred became a director of the Citizens Bank of Maryland and was named bank president in 1945; under his leadership, the bank expanded to more than 100 branches before his death in 1987.

When Harry Smith died in 1940, he bequeathed the Riverdale Park property to his eldest child, Kathleen M. Smith, a Harvard graduate and educator. She continued to live in the house until her death in 1989 at the age of 94, ending approximately a century of continuous Smith family ownership.

== Architecture ==
The Harry Smith House is a wood-frame dwelling that blends the exuberant ornamentation of the Queen Anne style of the 1880s with the more regularized foursquare plan that gained popularity at the turn of the 20th century. The house exemplifies the residential architecture found in developing railroad suburbs of the 1890s. It was in near-original condition at the time of its National Register nomination, retaining the distinctive decorative details characteristic of the Queen Anne style.

The house stands on Oliver Street, which was originally named Washington Street in the 1889 Riverdale Park subdivision plat. As the earliest and best-preserved of the original Riverdale Park dwellings, the Smith House has served as a notable landmark and familiar visual feature of the community.

== Recognition ==
The Harry Smith House was listed on the National Register of Historic Places on May 4, 1993. It has been documented by the Historic American Buildings Survey (HABS) under survey number HABS MD-1078, with two photographs and nine measured drawings prepared by Judith M. Capen of the University of Maryland's Historic Preservation Program, and photographs by James W. Rosenthal. The HABS documentation was entered in the 1993 Charles E. Peterson Prize competition.

The house is also located within the Riverdale Park Historic District, which was listed on the National Register in 2002, recognizing the broader community's significance in the areas of architecture and community planning.
