= Content (Upper Marlboro, Maryland) =

Historic house in Maryland, United States

- U.S. National Register of Historic Places
- U.S. Historic district – Contributing property
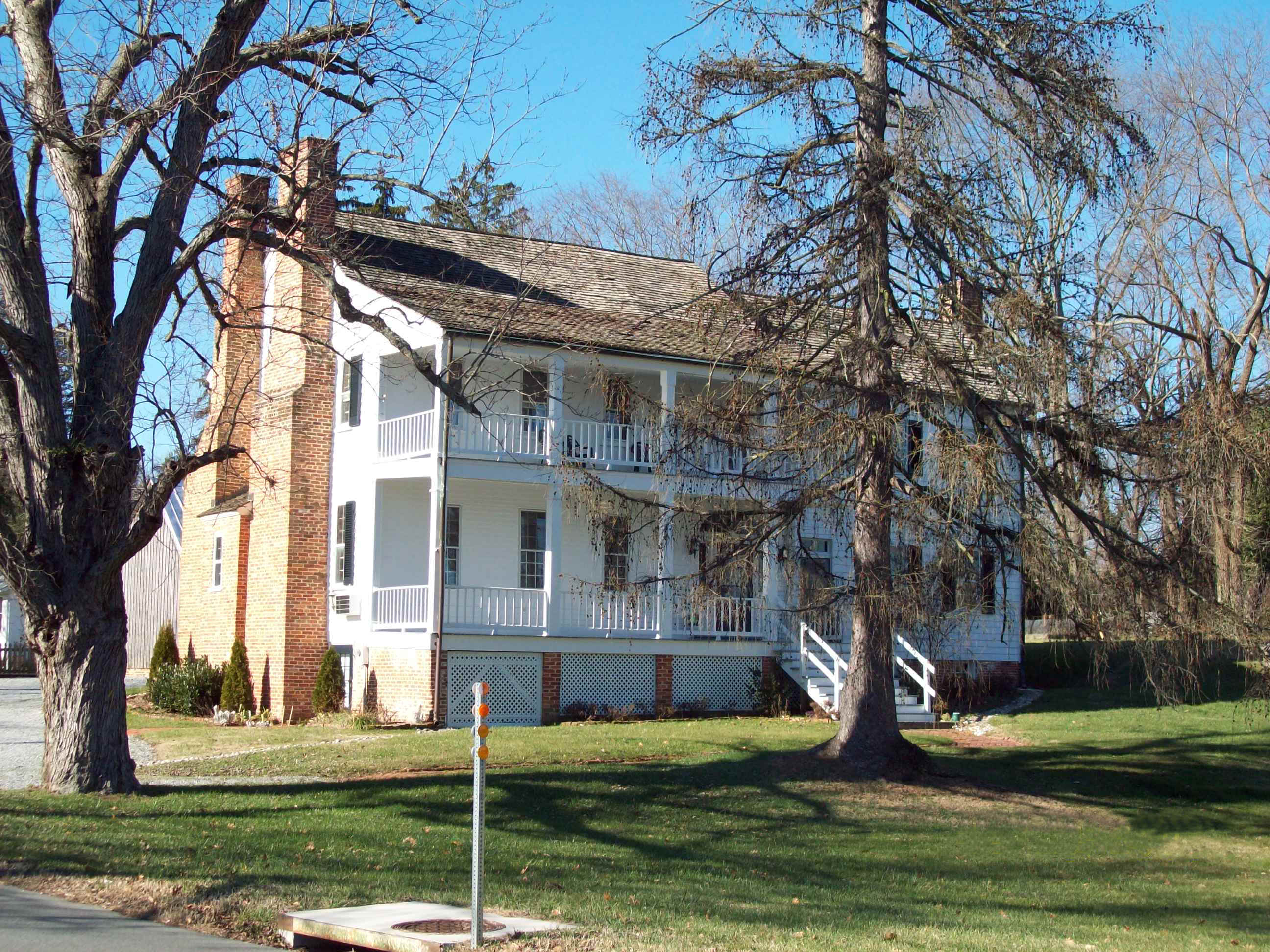
- Content, December 2008

- Location within Maryland Location within the United States
- Location: 14518 Church St., Upper Marlboro, Maryland
- Coordinates: 38°48′54″N 76°45′12″W
- Area: 1.2 acres (0.49 ha)
- Built: c. 1800
- NRHP reference No.: 78003119
- Added to NRHP: September 13, 1978

Content, also known as the Bowling House, is a historic home located in Upper Marlboro, Prince George's County, Maryland, United States, across the street from the county courthouse. The home is a 2 1/2-story, two-part frame structure built in three stages. The first section, built in 1787, consisted of the present main block, with a stair hall and porch added ca. 1800. A north wing was added before 1844. Content is one of the oldest buildings remaining in the county seat of Upper Marlboro, along with Kingston and the Buck (James Waldrop) House. Content has always been owned by prominent families in the civic, economic, and social affairs of town, county, and state including the Magruder, Beanes, and Lee families; and the Bowling and Smith families of the 20th century.

Content was listed on the National Register of Historic Places in 1978. It is located in the Upper Marlboro Residential Historic District.
