= Ridgeley School =

- U.S. National Register of Historic Places
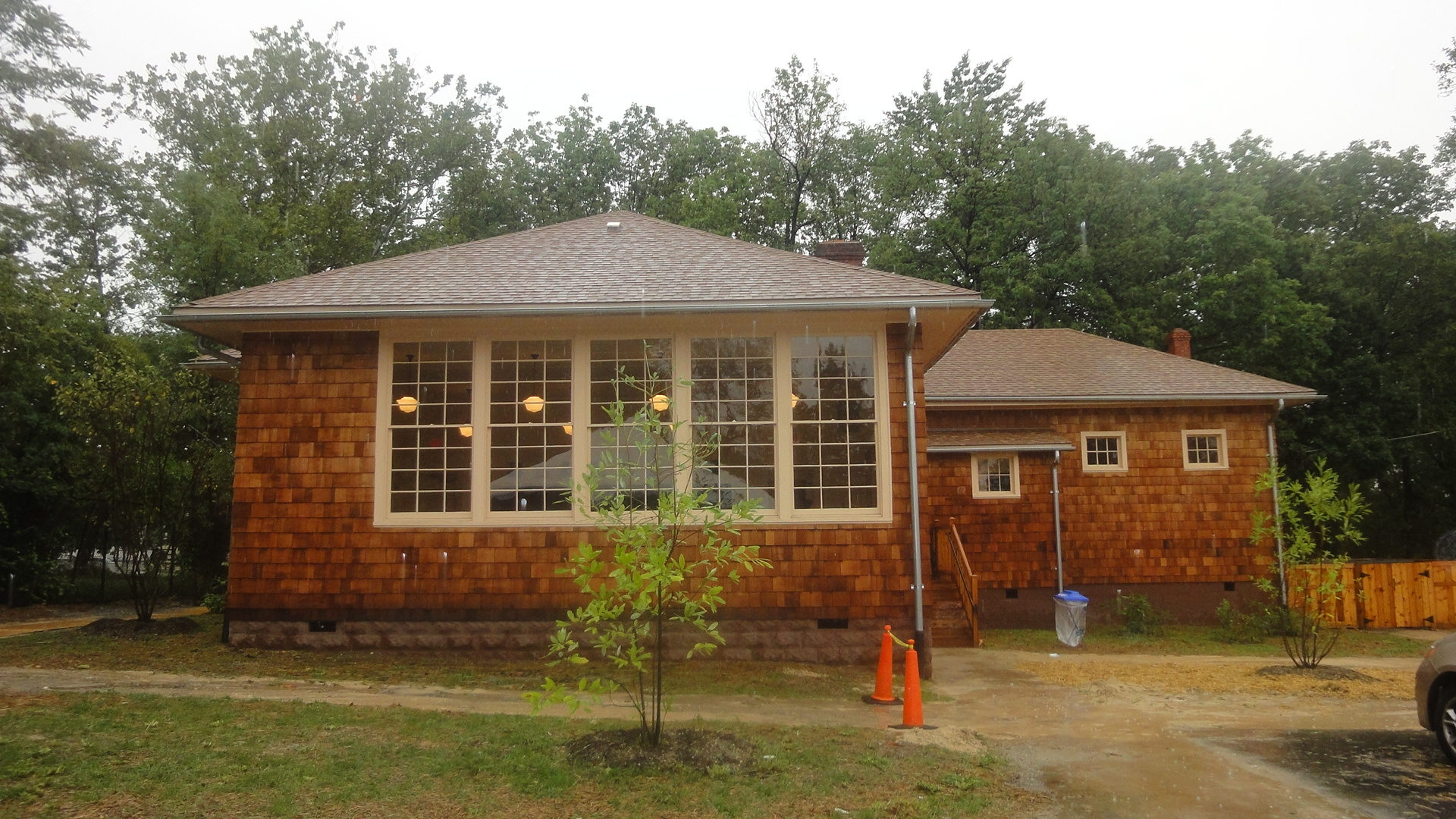
- Ridgeley School in September, 2011, after its restoration.

- Location within Maryland Location within the United States
- Location: 8507 Central Ave., Capitol Heights, Maryland
- Coordinates: 38°53′20″N 76°51′37″W
- Built: 1927
- NRHP reference No.: 14001093
- Added to NRHP: May 1, 2015

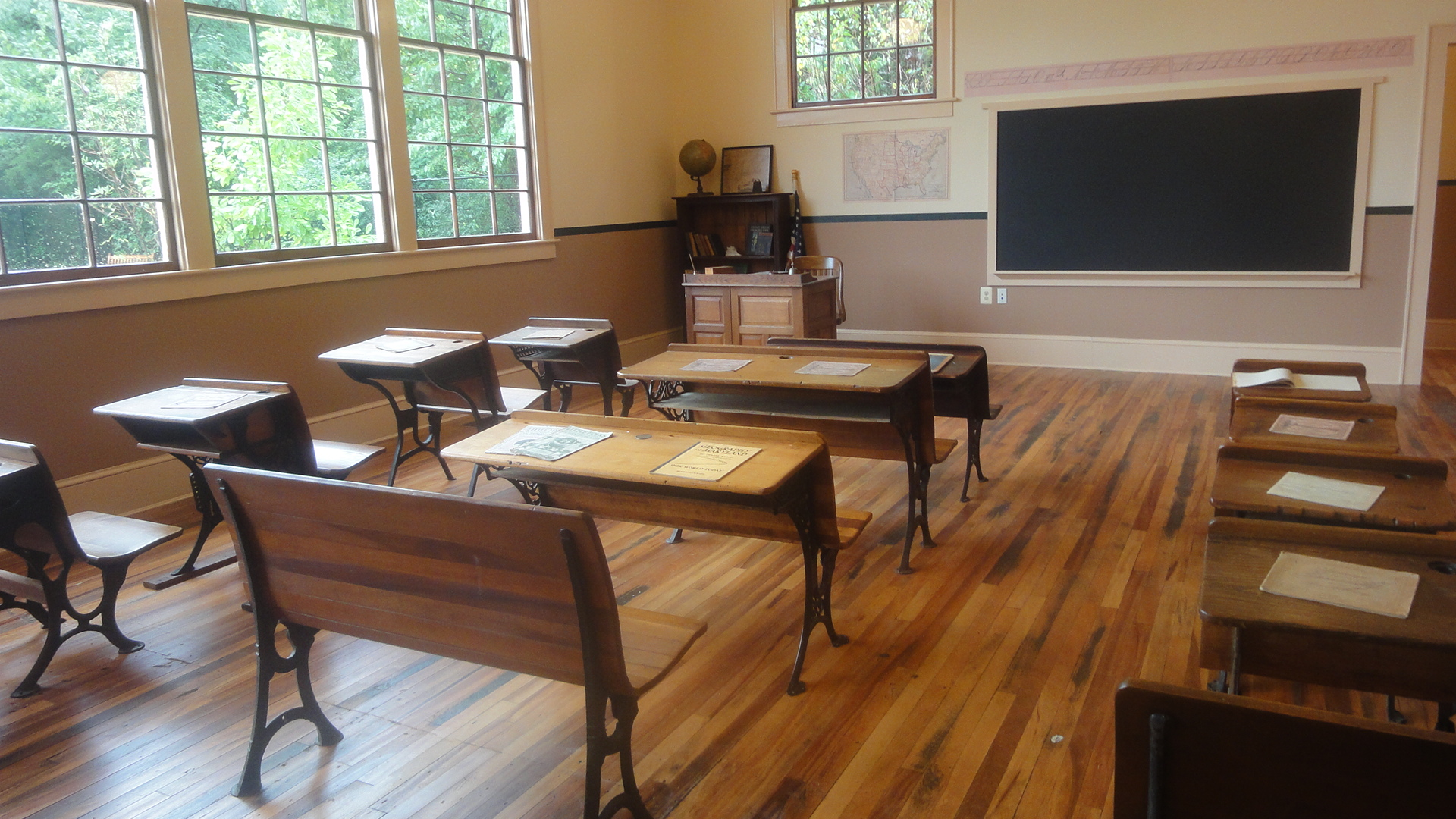
Interior of the restored school

The Ridgeley School is a historic Rosenwald school building at 8605 Central Avenue in Capitol Heights, Maryland. It is a single-story wood-frame structure with a hip roof, built in 1927 with funding support from the Rosenwald Fund. Originally built with two classrooms, a third was added later. In 2009-11 the property underwent restoration and conversion for use as a local history museum. It is one of four two-room Rosenwald schools built in Prince George's County.

The building was listed on the National Register of Historic Places in 2015.

== See also ==
- National Register of Historic Places listings in Prince George's County, Maryland
