= Spacecraft Magnetic Test Facility =

- U.S. National Register of Historic Places
- U.S. National Historic Landmark
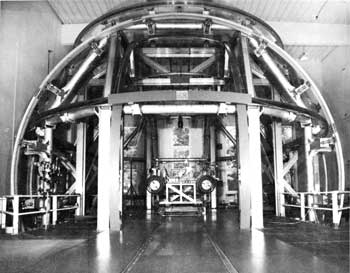

- Location within Maryland Location within the United States
- Location: Good Luck Road, Greenbelt, Maryland
- Coordinates: 39°0′24″N 76°49′31″W
- Built: 1966
- Architect: NASA
- NRHP reference No.: 85002811

Significant dates
- Added to NRHP: October 3, 1985
- Designated NHL: October 3, 1985

The Spacecraft Magnetic Test Facility, also known historically as the Attitude Control Test Facility, is an experimental spacecraft test facility at the Goddard Space Flight Center in Greenbelt, Maryland, United States. It was built in 1966 to allow the evaluation of magnetic movement in crewed and uncrewed spacecraft, and for the precision calibration of magnetometers used in space flight. The building is constructed of non-magnetic materials and contains a magnetic coil system that allows the cancellation of the Earth's magnetic field. This unique building was designated a National Historic Landmark in 1985.

The facility is currently managed by the Goddard Mechanical Systems Division.

== Description and history ==
The Spacecraft Magnetic Test Facility is located about 2 miles (3.2 km) east of the main campus of the Goddard Space Flight Center, in Building 310-20 on the north side of Good Luck Road. The building is a single-story structure, 60 feet (18 m) square, and is built entirely out of nonmagnetic materials. The building contains a 42-foot (13 m) diameter 3-axis Braunbek coil with four loops on each axis. The coil cancels the Earth's magnetic field within a central 6-foot (1.8 m) spherical volume. Fluctuations in the ambient field are removed by a servo control, producing stability to half a nanotesla. An artificial magnetic vector can be produced and rotated at a variable rate. 9.42-foot (2.87 m) Helmholtz coils are used for perm/deperm operations. A 6,000-pound (2,700 kg) monorail hoist is provided to move equipment in and out of the test area. HEPA filtration and air conditioning are provided. A turntable 8 feet (2.4 m) in diameter within the chamber is used for precision placement of the test object.

The facility was built in 1966, and has been used to determine and minimize the magnetic movement of uncrewed spacecraft and to calibrate flight magnetometers since the early years of the United States space program. It is able to (within certain limits) emulate the magnetic conditions found in orbital and interstellar space. It saw significant use until the 1990s. Its instruments are also capable of profiling the magnetic characteristics of the test objects. The facility's main difficulties have been with deteriorating current amplifiers, with replacements made in the 1970s and 1980s altering its performance characteristics.

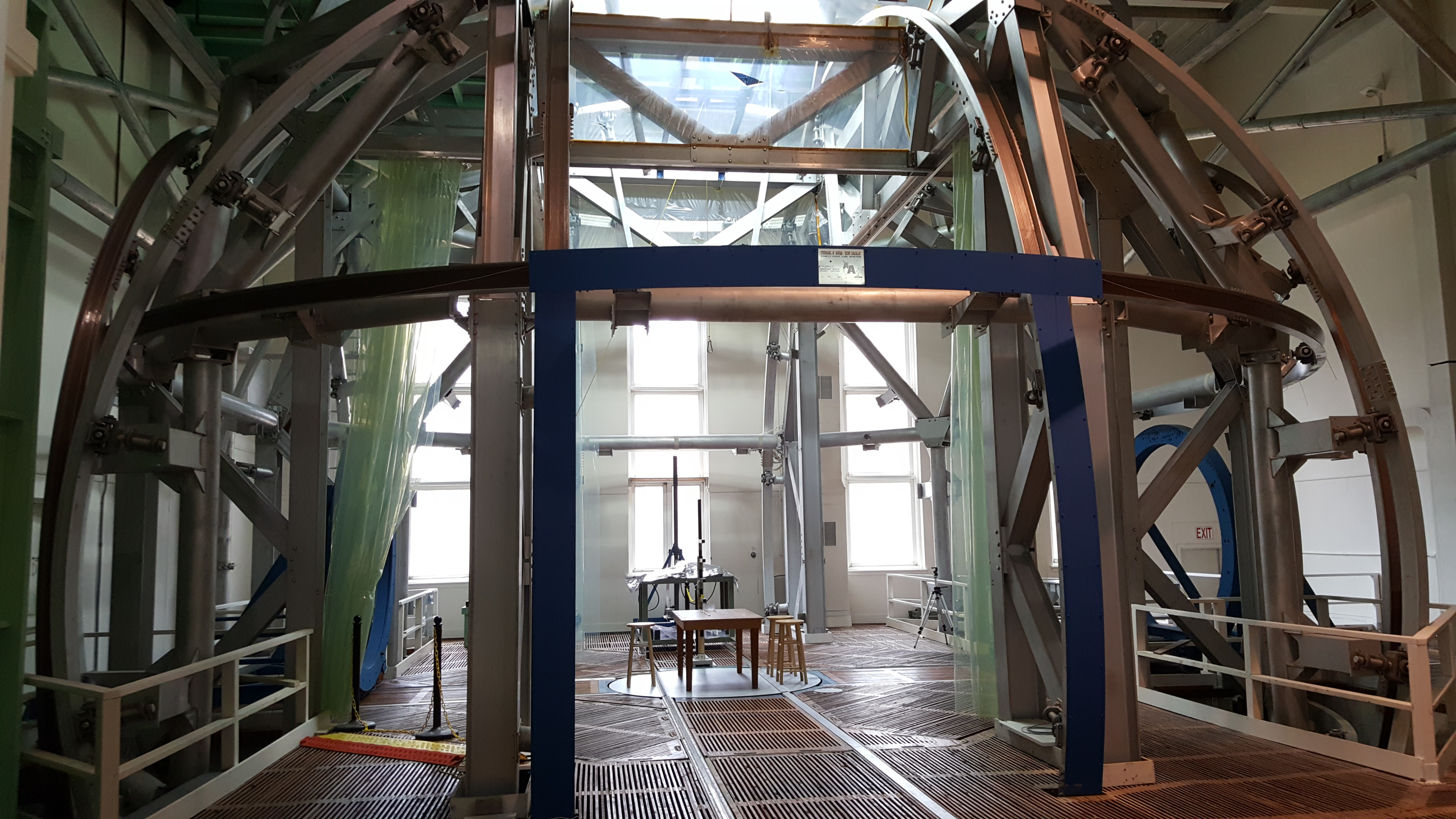

== See also ==
- List of National Historic Landmarks in Maryland
- National Register of Historic Places listings in Prince George's County, Maryland
