= Bowling Heights =

Historic house in Maryland, US

- U.S. National Register of Historic Places
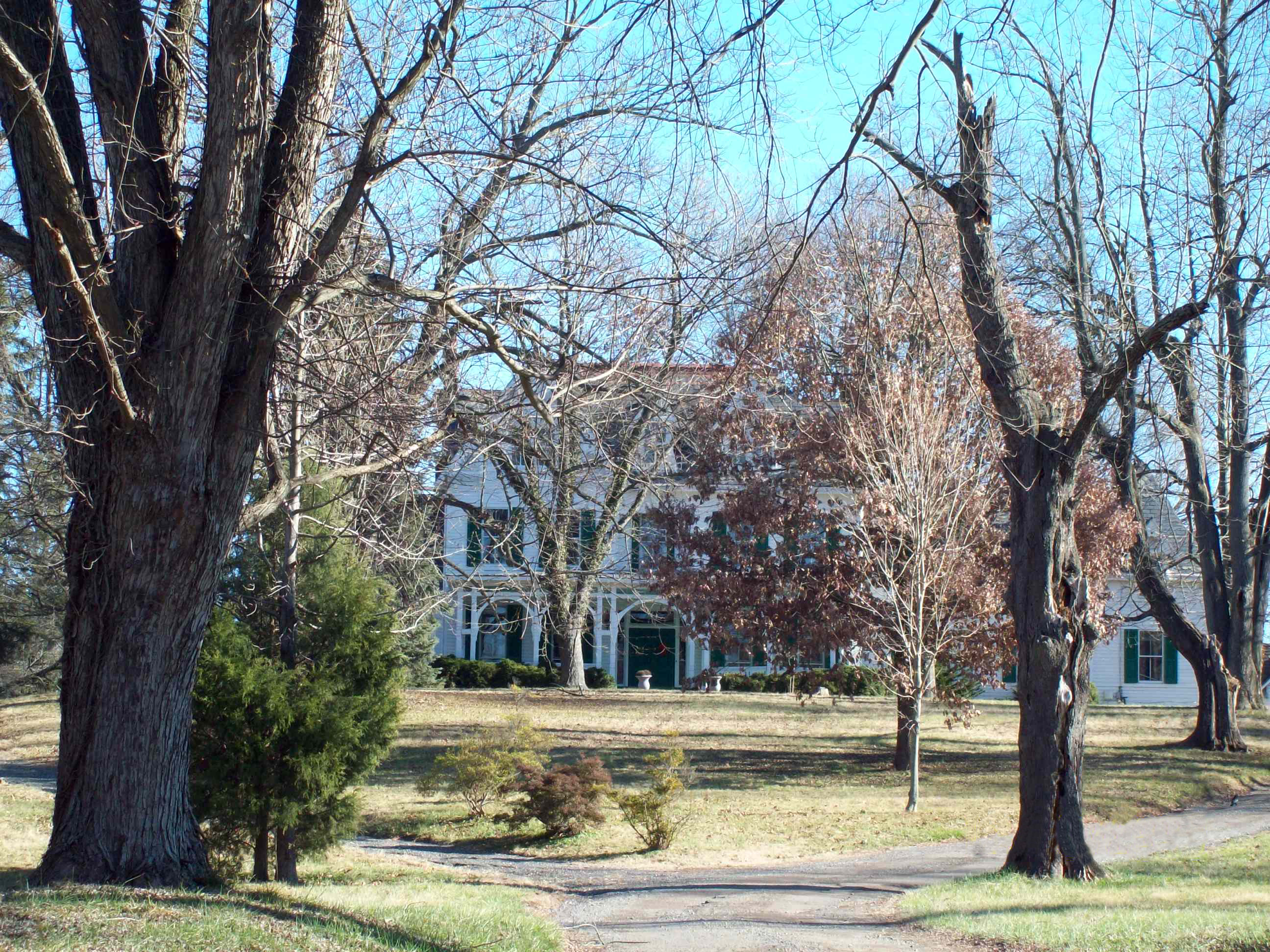
- Bowling Heights, December 2008

- Location within Maryland Location within the United States
- Location: 3610 Old Crain Highway, near Upper Marlboro, Maryland
- Coordinates: 38°50′22″N 76°43′31″W
- Area: 15 acres (6.1 ha)
- Built: 1877
- Built by: Ellis, George N.
- Architectural style: Gothic
- NRHP reference No.: 82001599
- Added to NRHP: November 30, 1982

Bowling Heights is a historic home located in Upper Marlboro, Prince George's County, Maryland, United States. It is a large 2 1/2-story frame house constructed in 1877 in the High Victorian Gothic style.

Bowling Heights was listed on the National Register of Historic Places in 1982.
