= John H. Traband House =

Historic house in Maryland, United States

- U.S. National Register of Historic Places
- U.S. Historic district – Contributing property
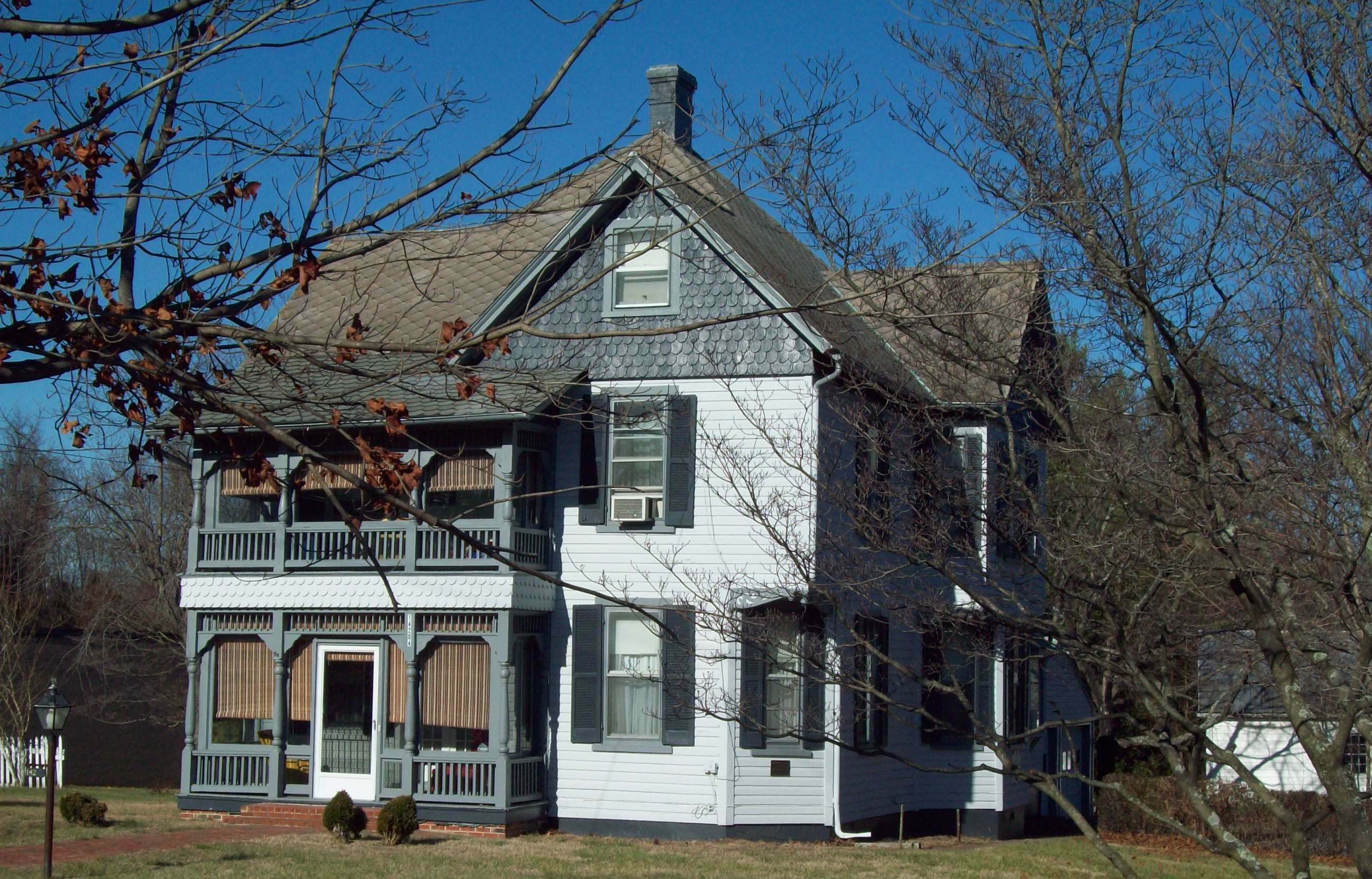
- John H. Traband House, December 2008

- Location within Maryland Location within the United States
- Location: 14204 Old Marlboro Pike, Upper Marlboro, Maryland
- Coordinates: 38°49′8″N 76°45′32″W
- Area: 0.8 acres (0.32 ha)
- Built: 1895
- Built by: Nicolson, Arthur F.; Cranford, Wesley B.
- Architectural style: Queen Anne
- NRHP reference No.: 84001856
- Added to NRHP: March 22, 1984

The John H. Traband House is a historic home located at Upper Marlboro in Prince George's County, Maryland, United States. It was built between 1895 and 1897, and is a 2 1/2-story, asymmetrically shaped Queen Anne influenced frame structure of modest size and detailing. Also located on the property are a frame two-story gable-roofed carriage house. The house was constructed as the residence of a prominent citizen, John H. Traband (1857–1938), who was a successful businessman and landholder in Upper Marlboro.

The John H. Traband House was listed on the National Register of Historic Places in 1984. It is located in the Upper Marlboro Residential Historic District.
