= Snow Hill (Laurel, Maryland) =

Historic house in Maryland, United States

- U.S. National Register of Historic Places
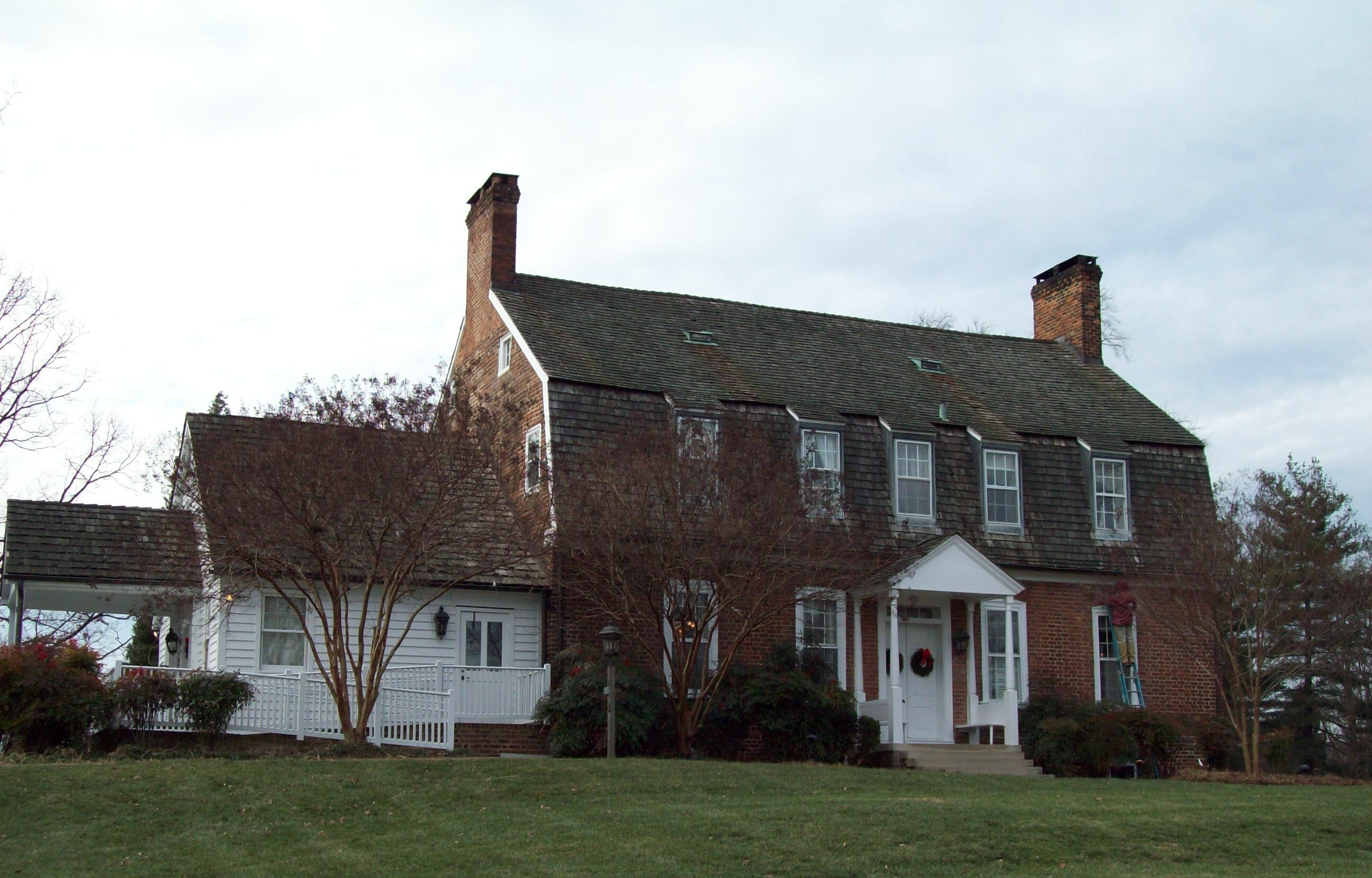
- Snow Hill East Front, December 2008

- Location within Maryland Location within the United States
- Location: 13301 Laurel-Bowie Road (Maryland 197), Laurel, Maryland
- Coordinates: 39°4′32″N 76°50′35″W
- Area: 10 acres (4.0 ha)
- Built: ca. 1800
- Architectural style: Late Georgian
- NRHP reference No.: 74002200
- Added to NRHP: August 13, 1974

Snow Hill is a manor house located south of Laurel, Maryland, off Maryland Route 197, in Prince George's County. Built between 1799 and 1801, the 1 1/2-story brick house is rectangular, with a gambrel roof, interior end chimneys, and shed dormers. It has a center entrance with transom and a small gabled porch. A central hall plan was used, with elaborate interior and corner cupboards. The original south wing was removed and rebuilt, and the home restored in 1940. The Late Georgian style house was the home of Samuel Snowden, part owner of extensive family ironworks, inherited from his father Richard Snowden. and is now owned and operated by the Maryland-National Capital Park and Planning Commission as a rental facility.

Snow Hill was listed on the National Register of Historic Places in 1974.

== Gallery ==
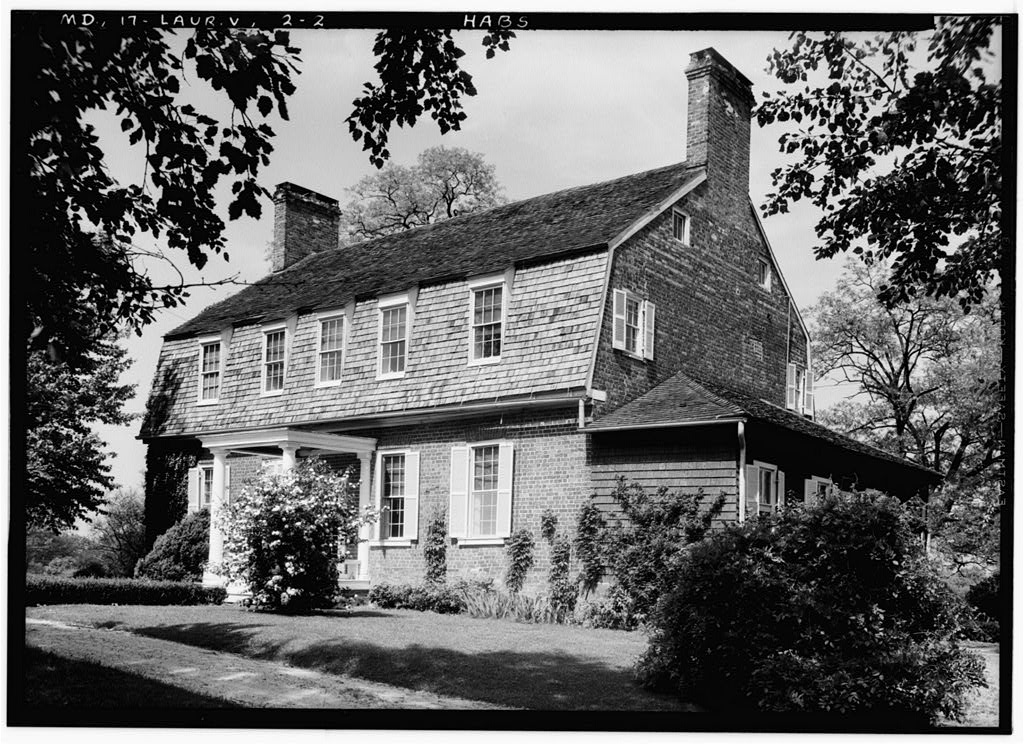
Snow Hill West Front, 1936

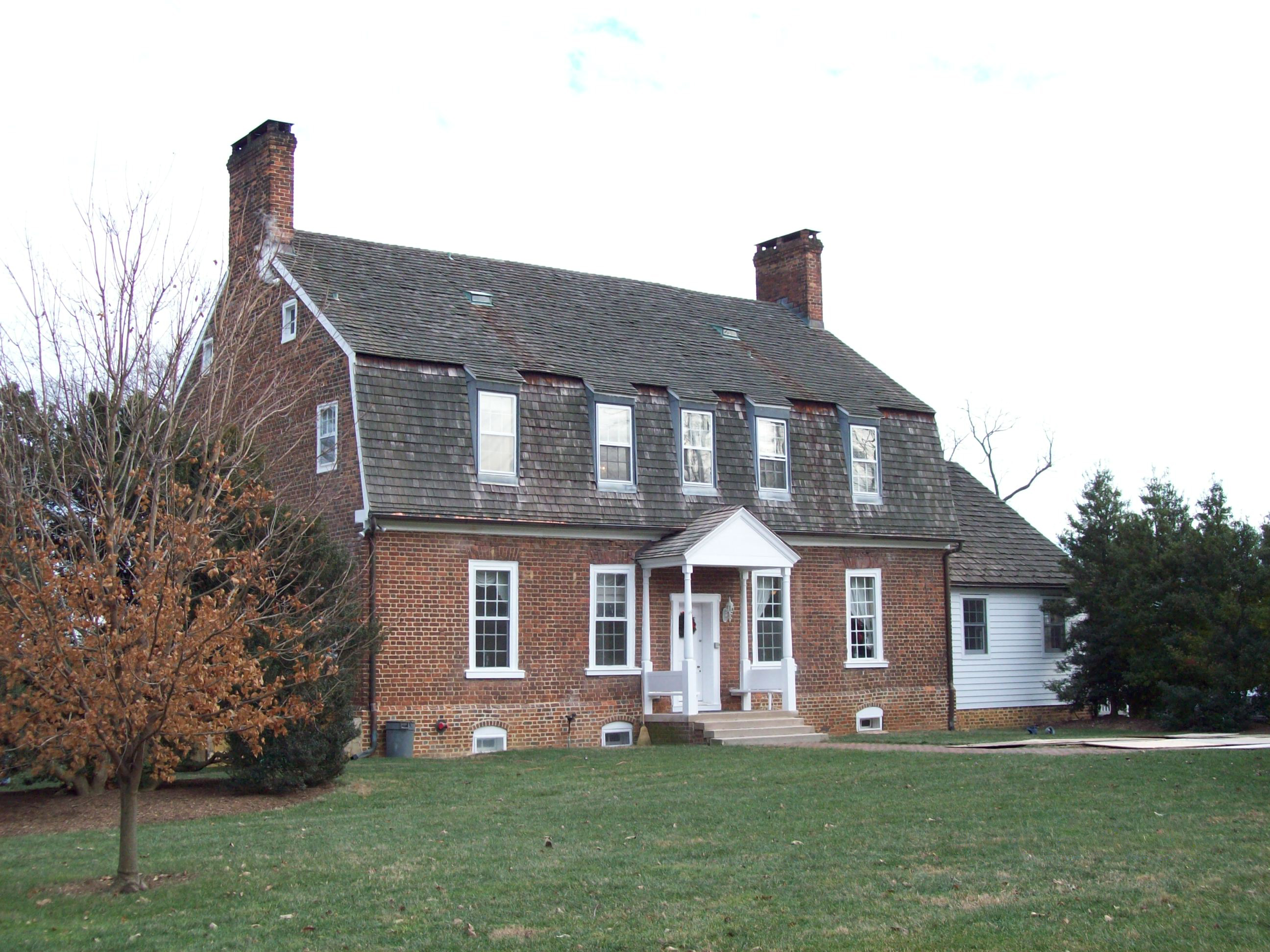
Snow Hill West Front, December 2008
