= Upper Marlboro Residential Historic District =

Historic district in Maryland, United States

- U.S. National Register of Historic Places
- U.S. Historic district
- Trinity Episcopal Church

- Location within Maryland Location within the United States
- Location: Roughly bounded by 14204 Old Marlboro Pike, 14519 Elm & 14508 Main Sts., Western Branch & 5600 Old Crain Hwy., Upper Marlboro, Maryland
- Coordinates: 38°48′56″N 76°45′16″W
- Area: 83.5 acres (33.8 ha)
- Built: 1730
- Architectural style: Greek Revival, Gothic Revival, Queen Anne, Colonial Revival, Tudor
- NRHP reference No.: 12001026
- Added to NRHP: December 12, 2012

The Upper Marlboro Residential Historic District is a national historic district encompassing a historic residential area of Upper Marlboro, Maryland. The area reflects the town's growth from the 18th to the 20th century, including its importance as the county seat of Prince George's County. The district also contained a significant post-American Civil War African-American population, which was making the transition from slavery to freedom. Located in the district are three previously listed properties: Kingston, Content, and the John H. Traband House.

Located at 5415 Old Crain Highway, Kingston is a 1 1/2-story wood-frame house dated to c. 1730. It is believed to be the oldest building in the town.

Another prominent feature of the district is the Trinity Episcopal Church at 14519 Church Street, an 1846 Gothic Revival church designed by Robert Carey Long, Jr.

The district was listed on the National Register of Historic Places in 2012.
