= William W. Early House (Brandywine, Maryland) =

Historic house in Maryland, United States

- U.S. National Register of Historic Places
- U.S. Historic district – Contributing property
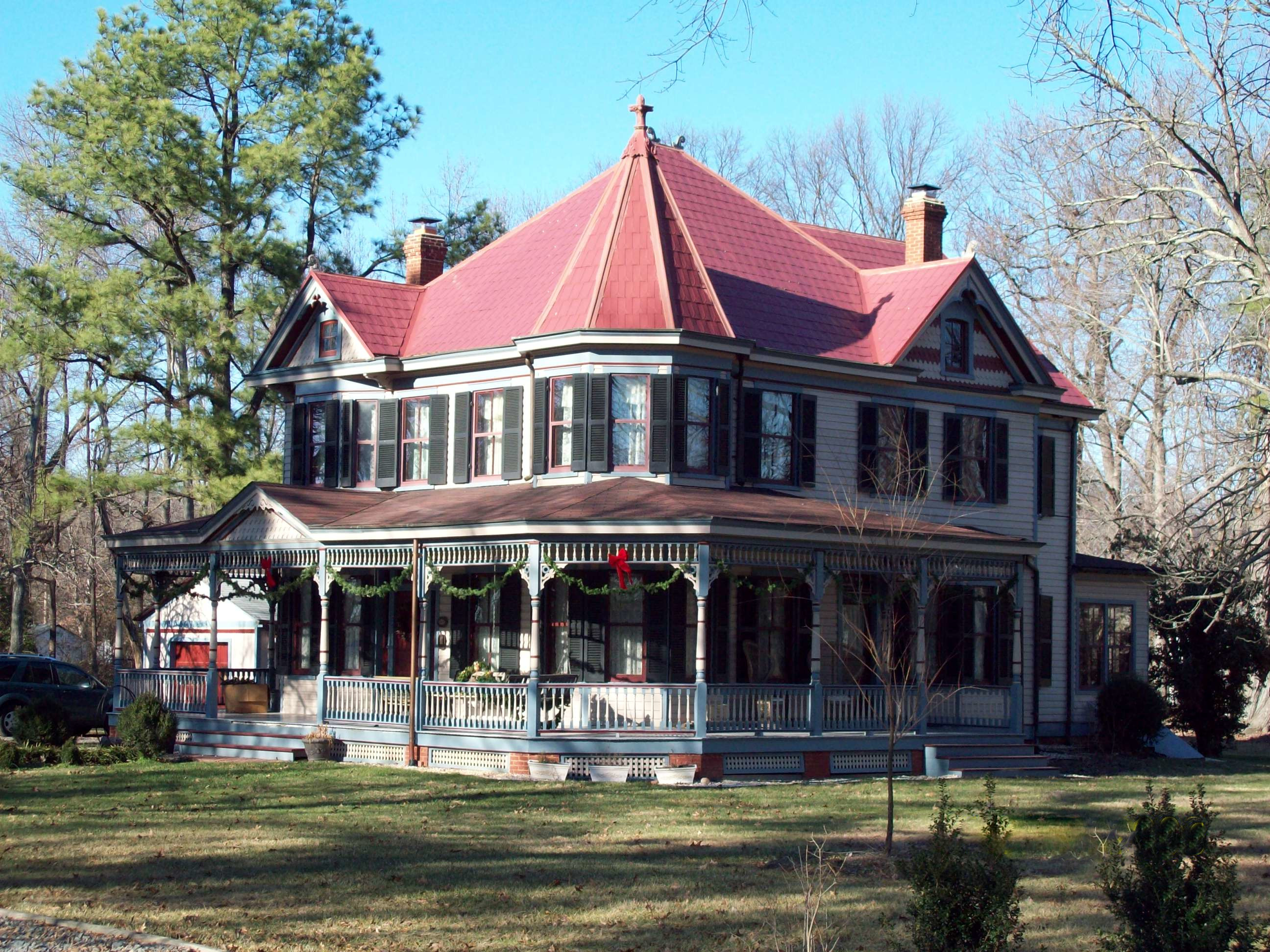
- William W. Early House, December 2008

- Location within Maryland Location within the United States
- Location: 13907 Cherry Tree Crossing Rd., Brandywine, Maryland
- Coordinates: 38°41′53″N 76°50′56″W
- Area: 3.3 acres (1.3 ha)
- Built: 1907
- Architectural style: Queen Anne
- Part of: Early Family Historic District (ID12001024)
- NRHP reference No.: 88000984

Significant dates
- Added to NRHP: June 30, 1988
- Designated CP: December 12, 2012

The William W. Early House is a Queen Anne-style house located at Brandywine in Prince George's County, Maryland, United States, and is privately owned. It was constructed in 1907. According to a 1989 Historic American Buildings Survey report on the house, "The William W. Early House is probably the best example of turn-of-the-century Queen Anne-style domestic architecture in the county."

== History ==
William W. Early had the house built on the property of his childhood home which included 23 acres of land. He was the grandson of William H. Early, an important landowner and developer of the village of Brandywine. William W. Early was the general manager for the Southern Maryland Railroad; this house contained his business office. The family resided in the house until 1949.

There were minor changes to the house in 1940 and 1970 for modernization.

The William W. Early House was listed on the National Register of Historic Places in 1988.

=== Architecture ===
This Queen Anne style house is roughly square, with a hip-roofed 2 1/2-story main block, and asymmetrical gable-roofed extensions, projecting bays, and corner tower, all decorated with fine jigsawn and shingle detail. A two-story octagonal tower forms one corner of the house.

== Present ==
The current house with 3,221 square feet of living space is on 3.27 acres. There was an extensive restoration in 2002. It has been featured on the Home and Garden Network's Old Homes Restored.
