= West Riverdale Historic District =

Historic district in Maryland, United States

- U.S. National Register of Historic Places
- U.S. Historic district
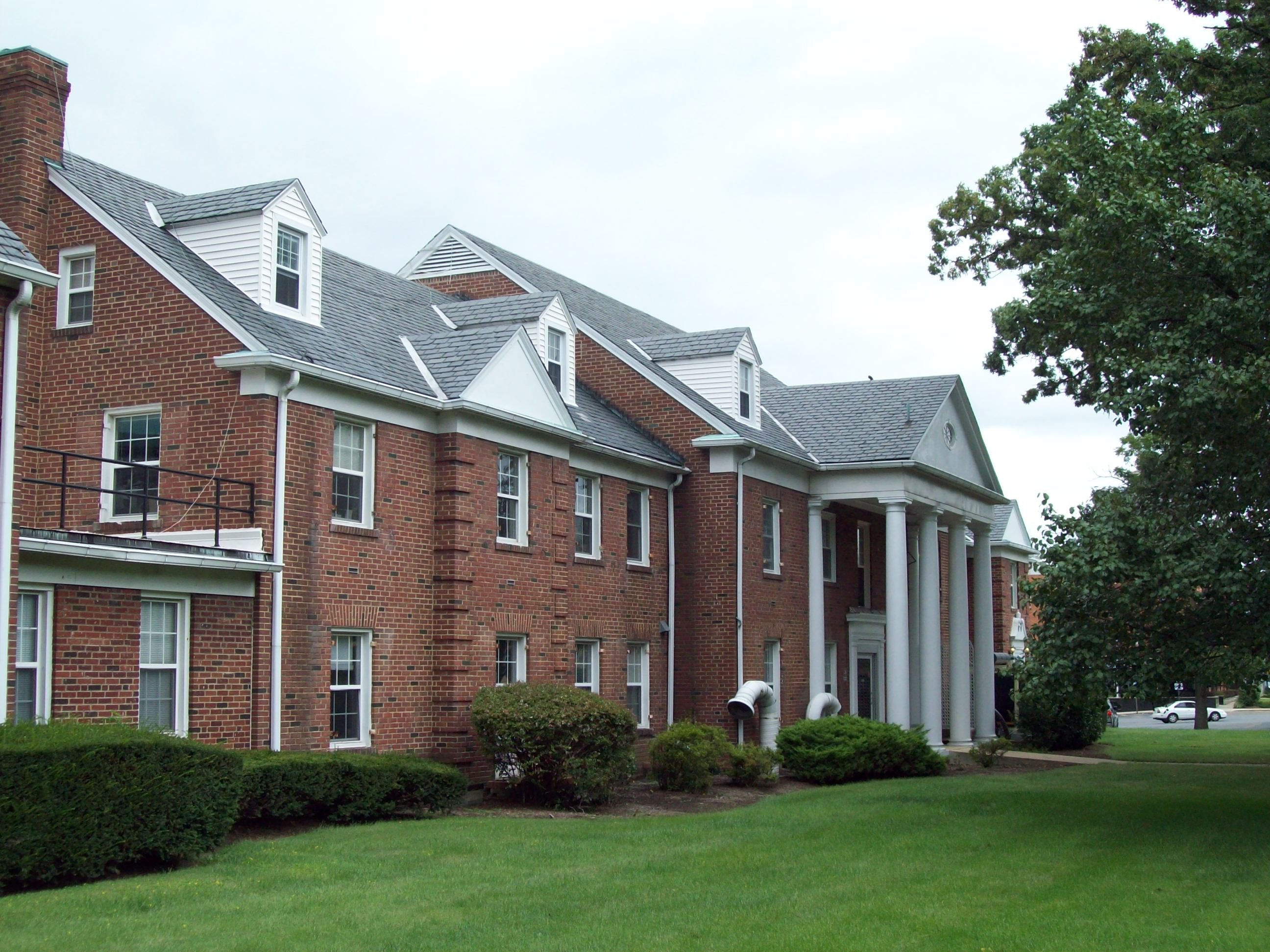
- former Leland Memorial Hospital, September, 2009

- Location within Maryland Location within the United States
- Location: Roughly bounded by East-West Hwy, 44th Place, the City of Hyattsville and 43rd St., Riverdale Park, Maryland
- Coordinates: 38°57′48″N 76°56′31″W
- Area: 23.5 acres (9.5 ha)
- Built: 1906
- Architect: Senseman, Ronald; Hubbard, Herbert, et al.
- Architectural style: Greek Revival, Colonial Revival, et al.
- NRHP reference No.: 02001609
- Added to NRHP: December 23, 2002

The West Riverdale Historic District is a national historic district located at Riverdale Park, Prince George's County, Maryland, a railroad suburb located northeast of Washington, D.C. The neighborhood was appended to the town of Riverdale Park soon after it was laid out and platted in 1906, and later enlarged in 1937. The district is defined by a modest variety of architectural styles and building types ranging from early-20th century vernacular interpretations of popular styles to diluted, suburbanized examples of revival styles that dominated the second quarter of the 20th century. These styles represent modest examples of Queen Anne, Colonial Revival, Spanish Colonial Revival, Craftsman, and Tudor Revival forms. At the center of the community is the former Eugene Leland Memorial Hospital, now known as the Crescent Cities Health and Rehabilitation Center.

It was listed on the National Register of Historic Places in 2002.
