= Mount Rainier Historic District =

Historic district in Maryland, United States

- U.S. National Register of Historic Places
- U.S. Historic district
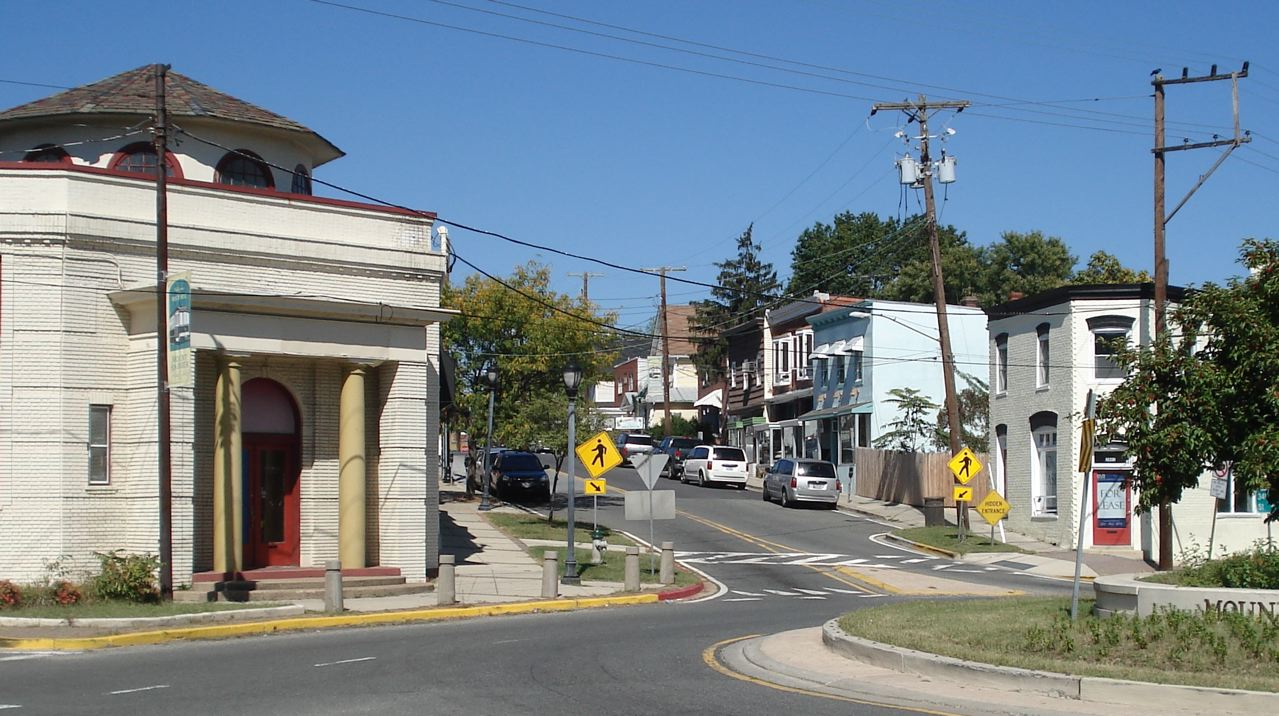
- Intersection of U.S. Route 1 and 34th St.

- Location within Maryland
- Location: Roughly bounded by Arundel St., 37th St., Bladensburg Rd. and Eastern Ave., Mount Rainier, Maryland
- Coordinates: 38°56′21″N 76°57′42″W
- Area: 260 acres (110 ha)
- Built: 1900
- Architect: Multiple
- Architectural style: Queen Anne, Late 19th And Early 20th Century American Movements
- NRHP reference No.: 90001319
- Added to NRHP: September 7, 1990

The Mount Rainier Historic District is a national historic district located at Mount Rainier, Prince George's County, Maryland, which began as a streetcar suburb located northeast of Washington, D.C. The district was built on a gently rolling rural landscape from about 1900 to 1940. The district contains more than 1,000 buildings, which are modestly scaled, detached, single-family, frame houses sited closely together with common setbacks. It consists primarily of single-family homes, with some small apartment buildings, a few duplexes, and single family homes that include a small storefront, usually located at the corner of an intersection. With the exception of five churches and a bank building known to have been designed by local architects, the remainder of the district's buildings are vernacular in character. Some homes contain Queen Anne detailing.

It was listed on the National Register of Historic Places in 1990.
