= Woodstock (Upper Marlboro, Maryland) =

Historic house in Maryland, United States

- U.S. National Register of Historic Places
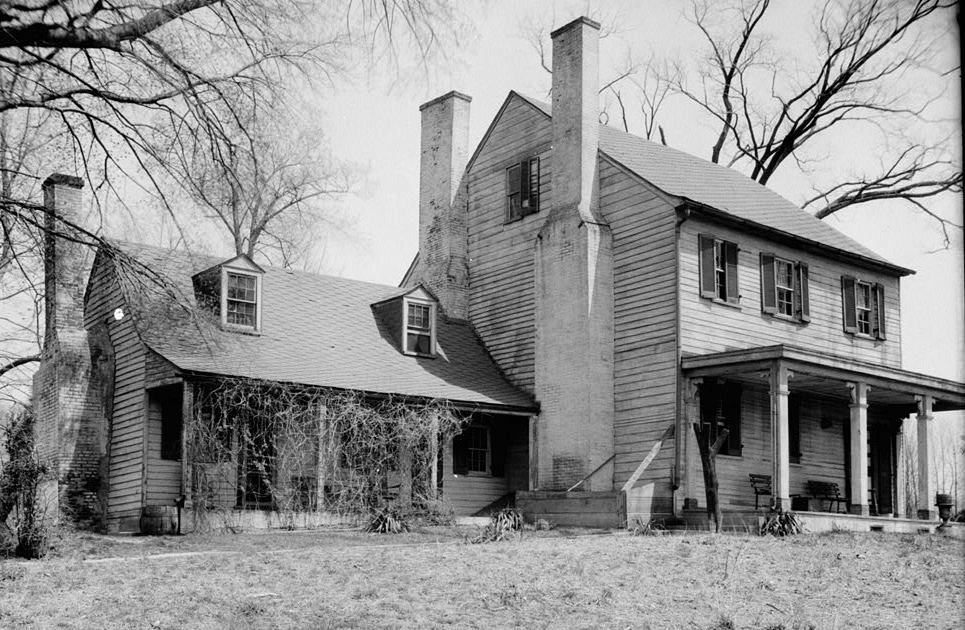
- Woodstock, 1936 HABS Photo

- Location within Maryland Location within the United States
- Location: 8706 SE. Crain Highway, Upper Marlboro, Maryland
- Coordinates: 38°46′10″N 76°48′7″W
- Area: 5 acres (2.0 ha)
- Built: c. 1850
- NRHP reference No.: 87001573
- Added to NRHP: September 21, 1987

Woodstock is a historic two-and-a-half-story residence located at Upper Marlboro, Prince George's County, Maryland, United States. The structure serves as a notable exemplar of a mid-19th-century plantation house, incorporating ornamental features characteristic of the Greek Revival style. The primary block is attributed to Washington Custis Calvert, with its construction likely dating to the early 1850s. Architecturally, the residence conforms to the regional Tidewater house style, a vernacular design adapted to the Atlantic coastal plain

Woodstock was listed on the National Register of Historic Places in 1987.
