= Pleasant Hills (Upper Marlboro, Maryland) =

Historic house in Maryland, United States

- U.S. National Register of Historic Places
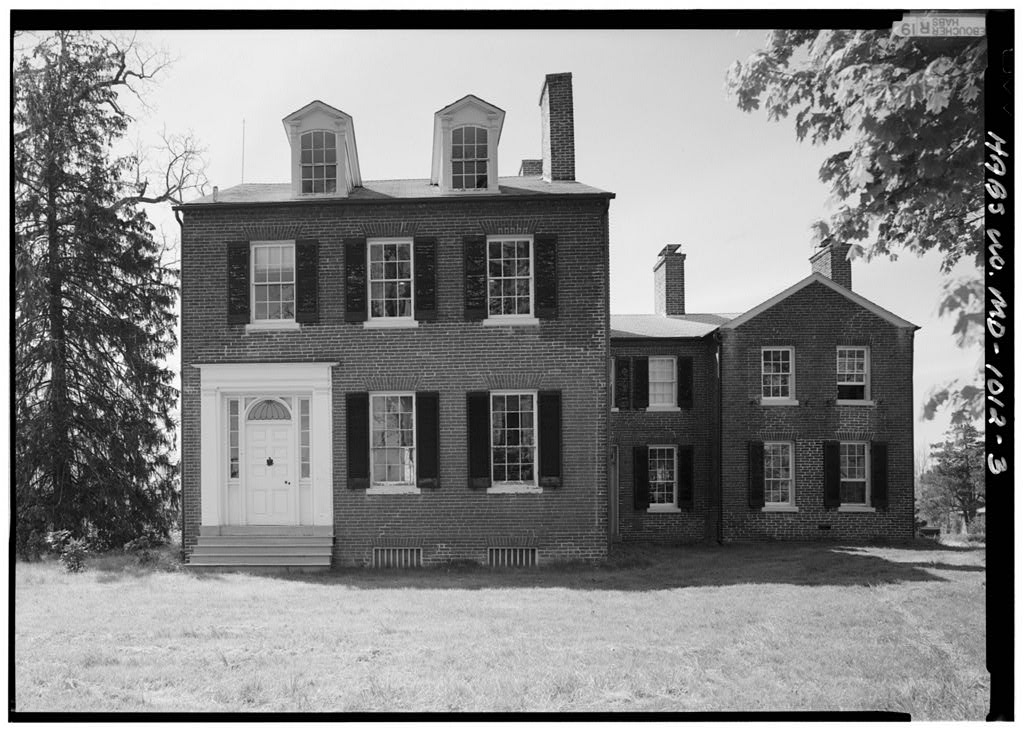
- Pleasant Hills, 1990 HABS Photo

- Location within Maryland Location within the United States
- Nearest city: Upper Marlboro, Maryland
- Coordinates: 38°47′35″N 76°45′51″W
- Built: 1810
- Architectural style: Classical Revival
- NRHP reference No.: 80004334
- Added to NRHP: August 6, 1980

Pleasant Hills is a historic home located near Upper Marlboro in Prince George's County, Maryland, United States. It is a large, two-part brick house with Greek Revival detailing. The more recent, main block, was built in 1836 by Zaddock Sasscer.

Pleasant Hills was built in a side-hall-and-double-parlor plan style that was popular among the wealthy planter class of Prince George's County during the early part of the 19th century. The property was the homestead of the Sasscer and Hill family, prominent in local politics and commerce, since the property was purchased by Zaddock Sasscer in 1807 as his "dwelling plantation".

The architectural details of the main block of the house suggest that it was constructed during the 1830s. In fact, the architrave around the windows and doorways are identical to one that appears in an Asher Benjamin builder's book of 1830. The two-story hyphen and wing date from earlier, however, and were already standing when Zaddock Sasscer bought them from Colmore Beans (brother to William Beanes of "Star Spangled Banner" fame) in 1807. According to the last owners from the family, their restoration/renovation process revealed building methods and materials in the kitchen wing that pre-dates the rest of the main block. This is also supported by a family legend that the original main block burned to the ground.

The side-hall and double-parlor plan in which Pleasant Hills was constructed is typical of homes built by the wealthy planter class of Prince George's County. The double parlors allowed for a "best parlor" for receiving guests and a less formal back parlor (also known as dining parlor or sitting room) where the family could retire. Double parlors could also allow for the partially separate, yet concurrent, entertaining of ladies and gentlemen. One parlor contained the typical accouterments of an early 19th-century parlor, including a dozen chairs, sofa, table, parlor mirror and three pictures.

The second of the two parlors contained a parlor lamp, sideboard, two tables, book stand, liquor case, and a few odds and ends. As was typical of the family parlor, this room appears to have been used for dining and reading or other forms of relaxation. Still another room (probably the one adjoining the kitchen in the old section) lists a sideboard, cupboard, table, and chairs.

The considerable amount of space given over to the hall passage further reflects the rise in the importance of separating social space from family space, and the control over circulation through rooms that occurred during the mid-18th century. The large hall served as both a formal entry into the house and a transitional space between the two parlors and the outside. It also allows for entry into either parlor without having to go through multiple rooms. The hall passage which runs from front to rear as seen at Pleasant Hills also allowed for cross ventilation, which was particularly important during summer months. Numerous inventories indicate that these passages were often used as living rooms during that time. It is not unusual to see listed dining or other tables, couches, desks, etc. within passages (or even bedsteads in second-floor passages). From these inventories the hall passage is speculated to be an integral part of the overall plan and probably served as more than just a formal entry.

The period in architecture in which Pleasant Hills was constructed embraced the neoclassical in both its Roman and Greek forms: Adamesque Georgian, Federal and Greek Revival. These elements are seen at Pleasant Hills in their vernacular form. Houses such as Pleasant Hills, located in rural areas removed from large, fashionable cites, were built by local carpenter/builders using builders' guides or pattern books. In fact, the architrave molding found around the windows and doors of the first story of the main block can be found in Asher Benjamin's builder's book, The Practical House Carpenter, published in 1830 (plate 46). Benjamin outlines Grecian-influenced patterns for moldings, architraves, frontispieces, and so on. As stated by Benjamin, "I consider it necessary that all practical house carpenters should be fully acquainted with the orders of architecture, particularly those who reside in the country, where they have no opportunity of consulting an architect."

Zaddock Sasscer's property included 350 acres of "Four Hills," "Moore's Craft" and "Littleworth." Sasscer also had an additional 400-acre "plantation", inherited from his father, on which he raised tobacco. As his will states, "...I wish the tobacco now on hand to be sold...." Also mentioned in the tax assessment records for William Sasscer is the "land with distillery on it... 3-3/4 acres" (and included in the inventory of his estate are 22 barrels). The inventory also indicates that sheep and lamb were raised on the plantation, which also included oxen, cows and pigs; and twenty-six slaves (fourteen men and boys and twelve women and children).

Pleasant Hills was listed on the National Register of Historic Places in 1980.
