= Kingston (Upper Marlboro, Maryland) =

Historic house in Maryland, United States

- U.S. National Register of Historic Places
- U.S. Historic district – Contributing property
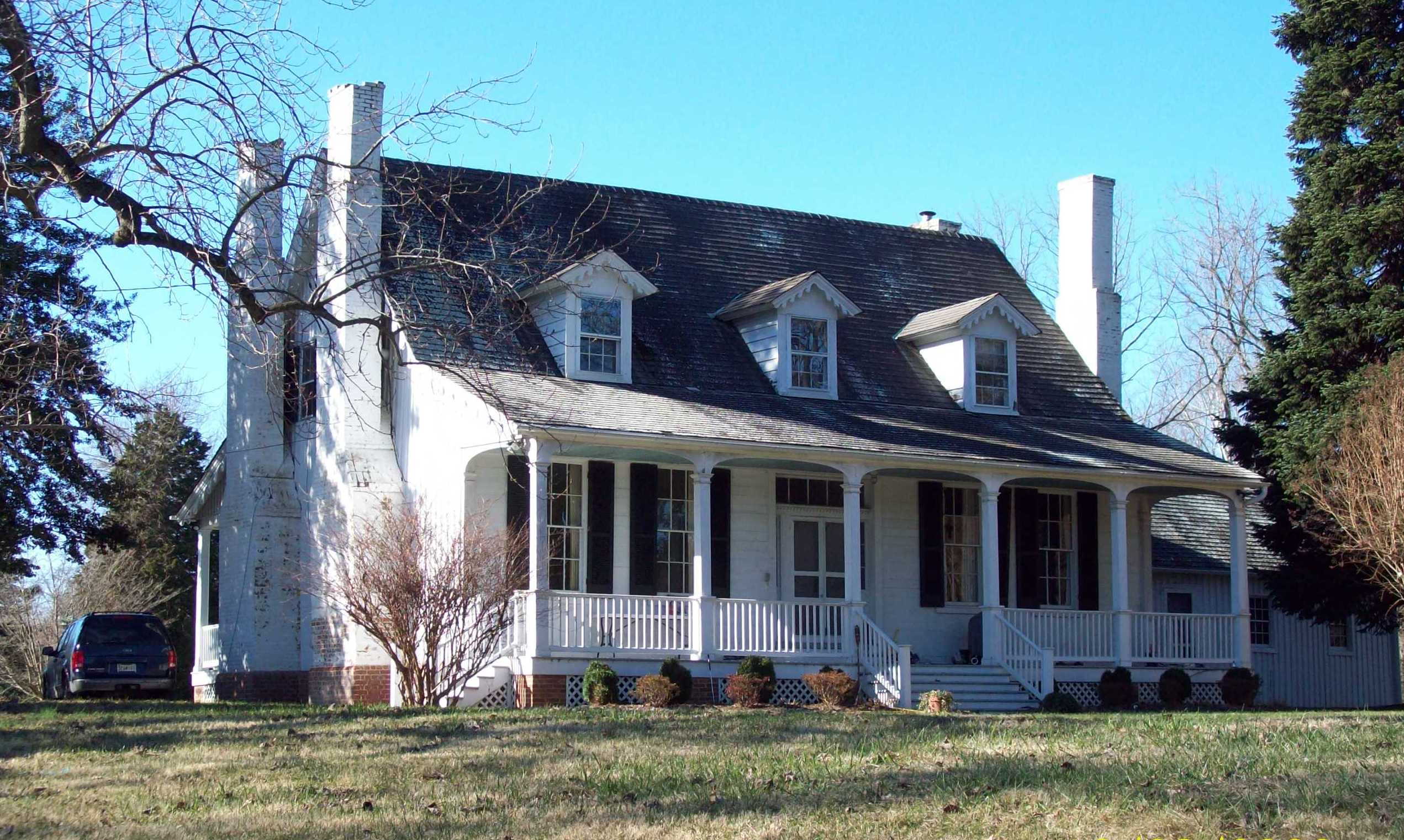
- Kingston, December 2008

- Location within Maryland Location within the United States
- Location: 5415 Old Crain Hwy., Upper Marlboro, Maryland
- Coordinates: 38°48′52″N 76°45′21″W
- Area: 3.2 acres (1.3 ha)
- Built: 1730
- Architectural style: Late Victorian, Colonial
- NRHP reference No.: 78003120
- Added to NRHP: July 21, 1978

Kingston, or Sasscer's House, is a 1 1/2-story historic home located at Upper Marlboro, Prince George's County, Maryland, United States. It is believed to be the oldest building remaining in the town of Upper Marlboro and may have been built, at least in part, before 1730. Many alterations and additions were made to it in the Victorian era, including "gingerbread" details typical of this era. The Craufurd family cemetery is located in the woods northwest of the house.

Kingston was listed on the National Register of Historic Places in 1978. It is located in the Upper Marlboro Residential Historic District.
