= The Cottage (Upper Marlboro, Maryland) =

Historic house in Maryland, United States

- U.S. National Register of Historic Places
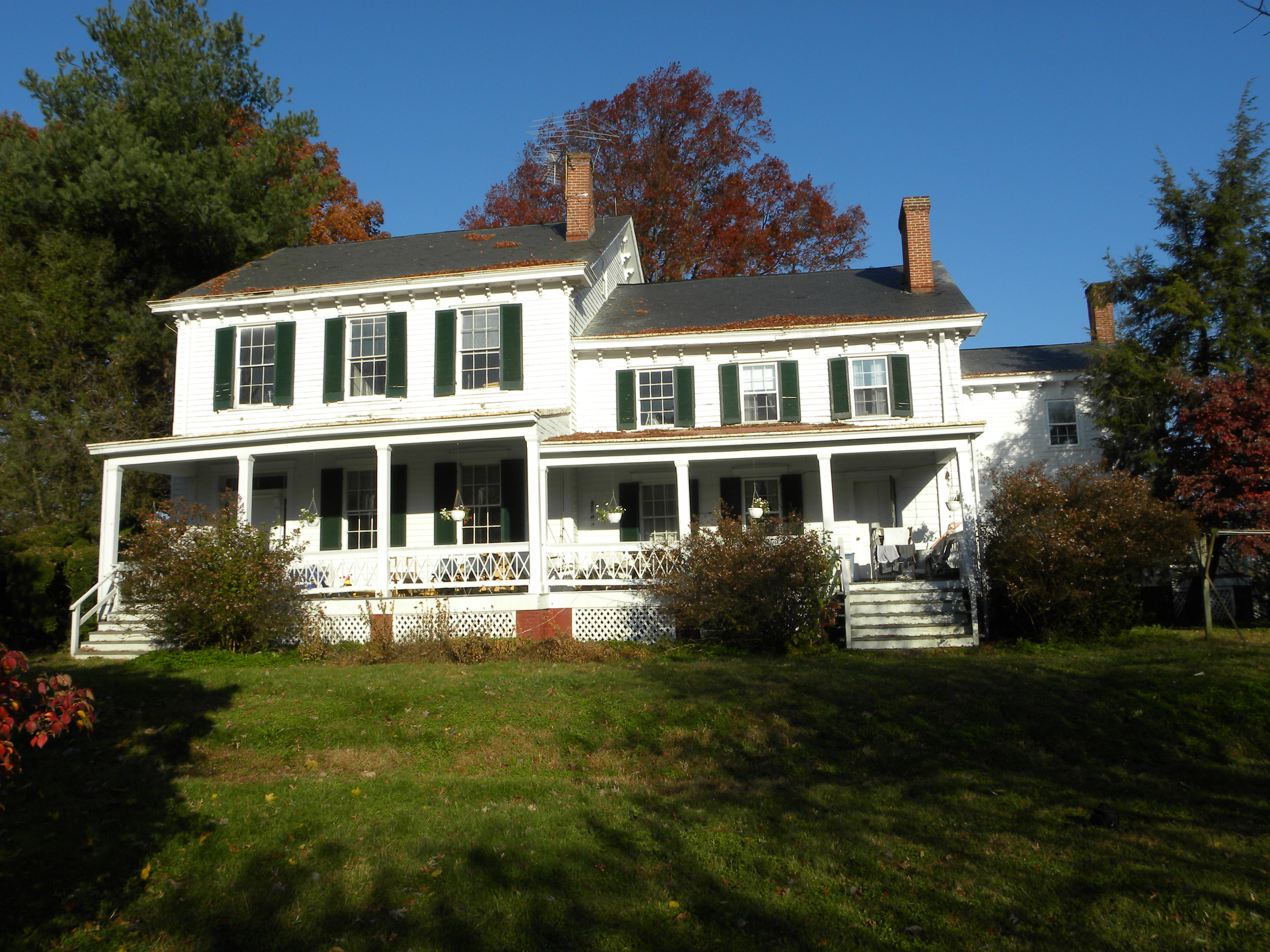
- The Cottage, November 2011

- Location within Maryland Location within the United States
- Nearest city: 11904 Old Marlboro Pike, Upper Marlboro, Maryland
- Coordinates: 38°49′21″N 76°47′55″W
- Area: 281.8 acres (114.0 ha)
- Built: 1846
- Architectural style: Greek Revival, Italianate
- NRHP reference No.: 89000769
- Added to NRHP: July 13, 1989

The Cottage is a 19th-century plantation complex located near Upper Marlboro in Prince George's County, Maryland. The complex consists of the principal three-part plantation house with its grouping of domestic outbuildings and four tenant farms, scattered over 282 acres (114 ha). The plantation house has a 2 1/2-story main block constructed in the 1840s with a typical Greek Revival style interior trim and distinctive Italianate cornice brackets. Within 150 feet (46 m) to the northwest of the house is a complex of domestic outbuildings, including a well house, ice house, and meat house. It was the home of Charles Clagett (1819–1894), a prominent member of Upper Marlboro social and political society during the second half of the 19th century. He served as a county commissioner following the Civil War.

It was listed on the National Register of Historic Places in 1989.
