= Riverdale Park Historic District =

Historic house in Maryland, United States

- U.S. National Register of Historic Places
- U.S. Historic district
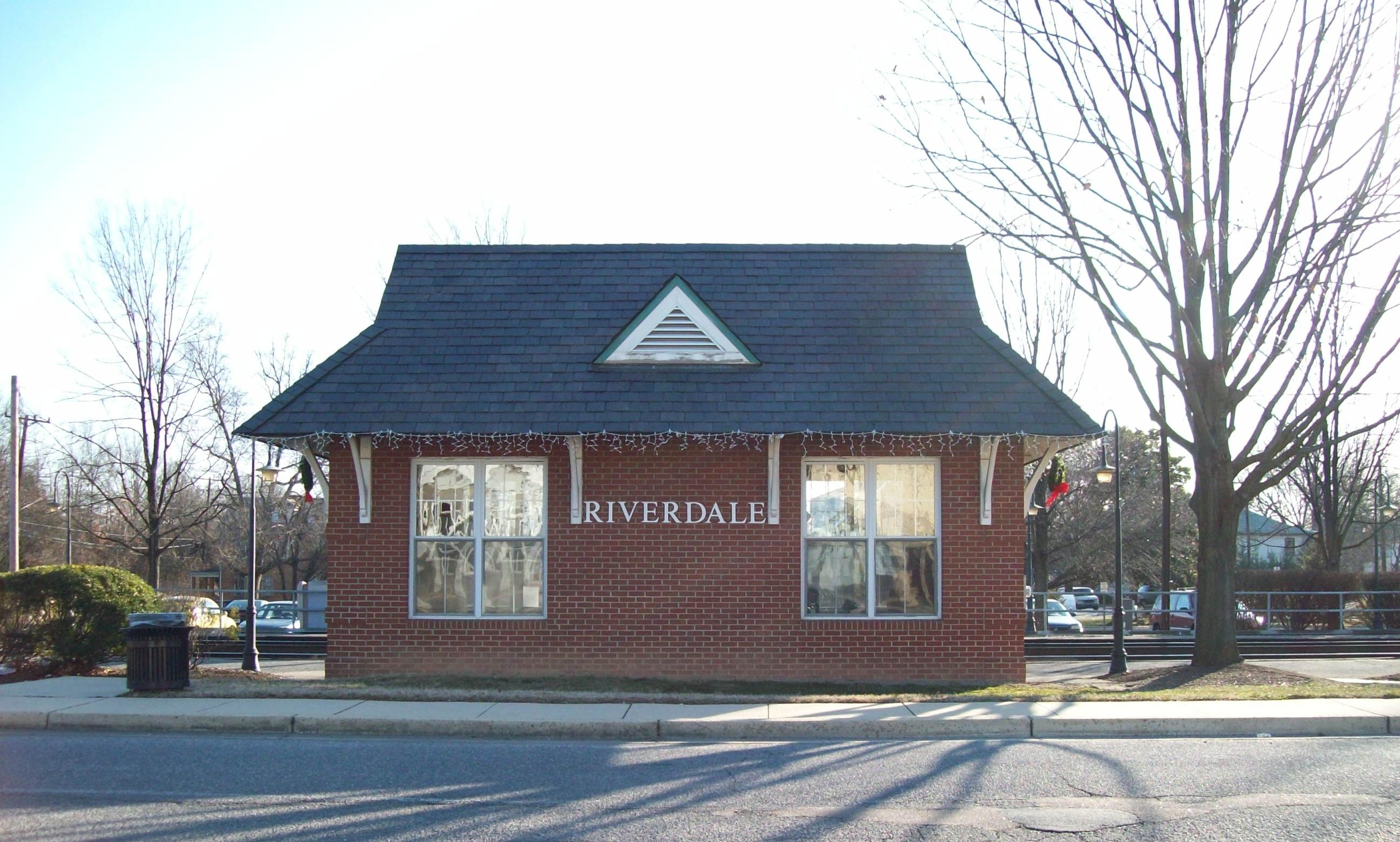
- Riverdale Park Railroad Station, December 2008

- Location within Maryland Location within the United States
- Location: Roughly bounded by Tuckerman St., Taylor Rd., Oglethorpe St., the B&O RR tracks, Madison St. and Baltimore Ave., Riverdale Park, Maryland
- Coordinates: 38°57′59″N 76°56′12″W
- Built: 1801
- Architect: Blundon, Joseph A.; Wilson, Walter R.
- Architectural style: Federal, Queen Anne
- NRHP reference No.: 02001608
- Added to NRHP: December 23, 2002

The Riverdale Park Historic District is a national historic district located at Riverdale Park, Prince George's County, Maryland. The community developed starting in 1889, around the B & O passenger railroad station, as an early railroad suburb northeast of Washington, D.C. Later, 20th century additions expanded the community. One of the more imposing features of the community is the early-19th-century mansion known as Riversdale. In general residential styles range from large 2 1/2-story wood-frame dwellings to smaller bungalows, with an eclectic collection of imposing Queen Anne and Colonial Revival houses.

It was listed on the National Register of Historic Places in 2002.

== Gallery ==
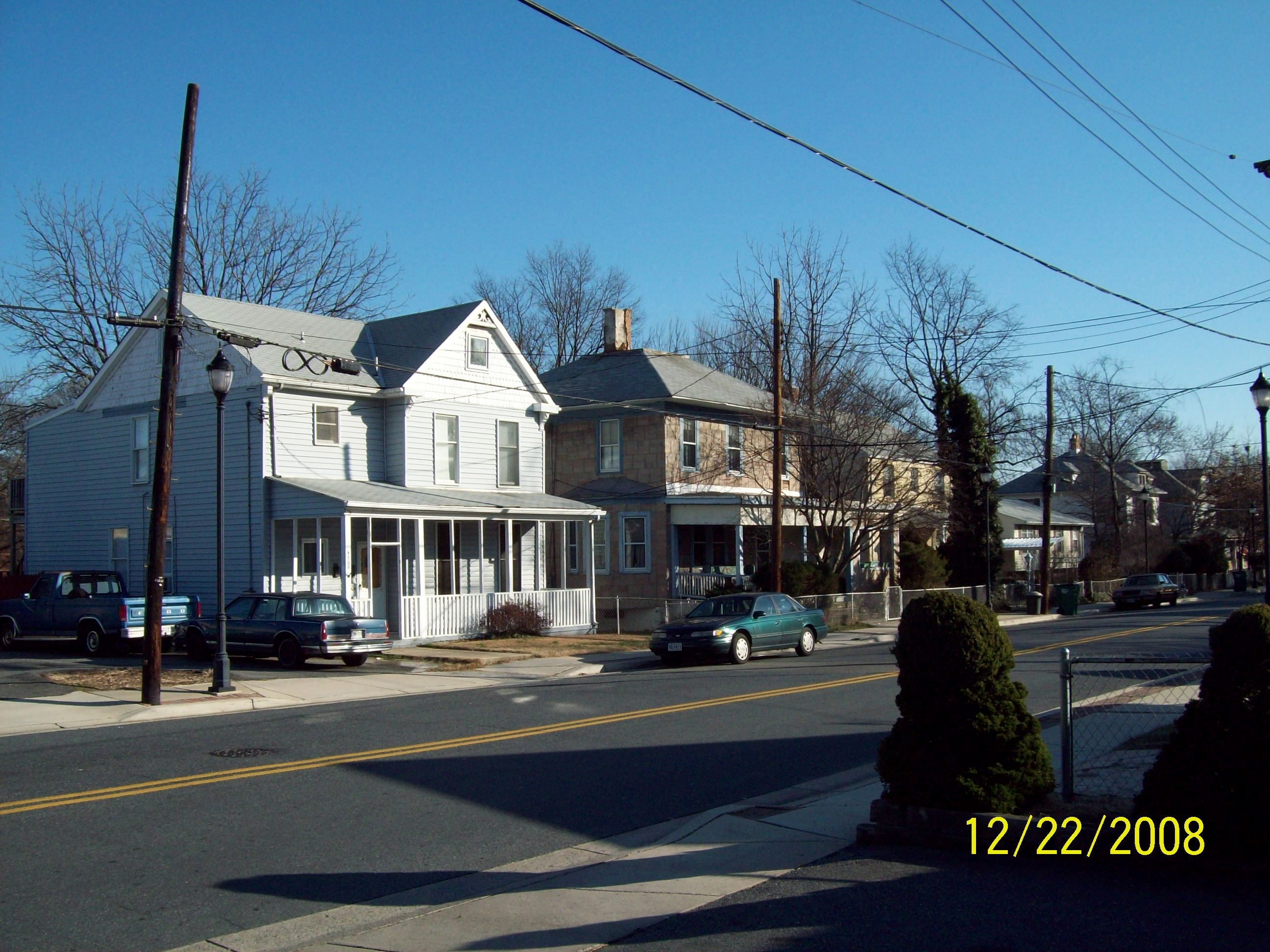
Typical Street in Riverdale Park, December 2008

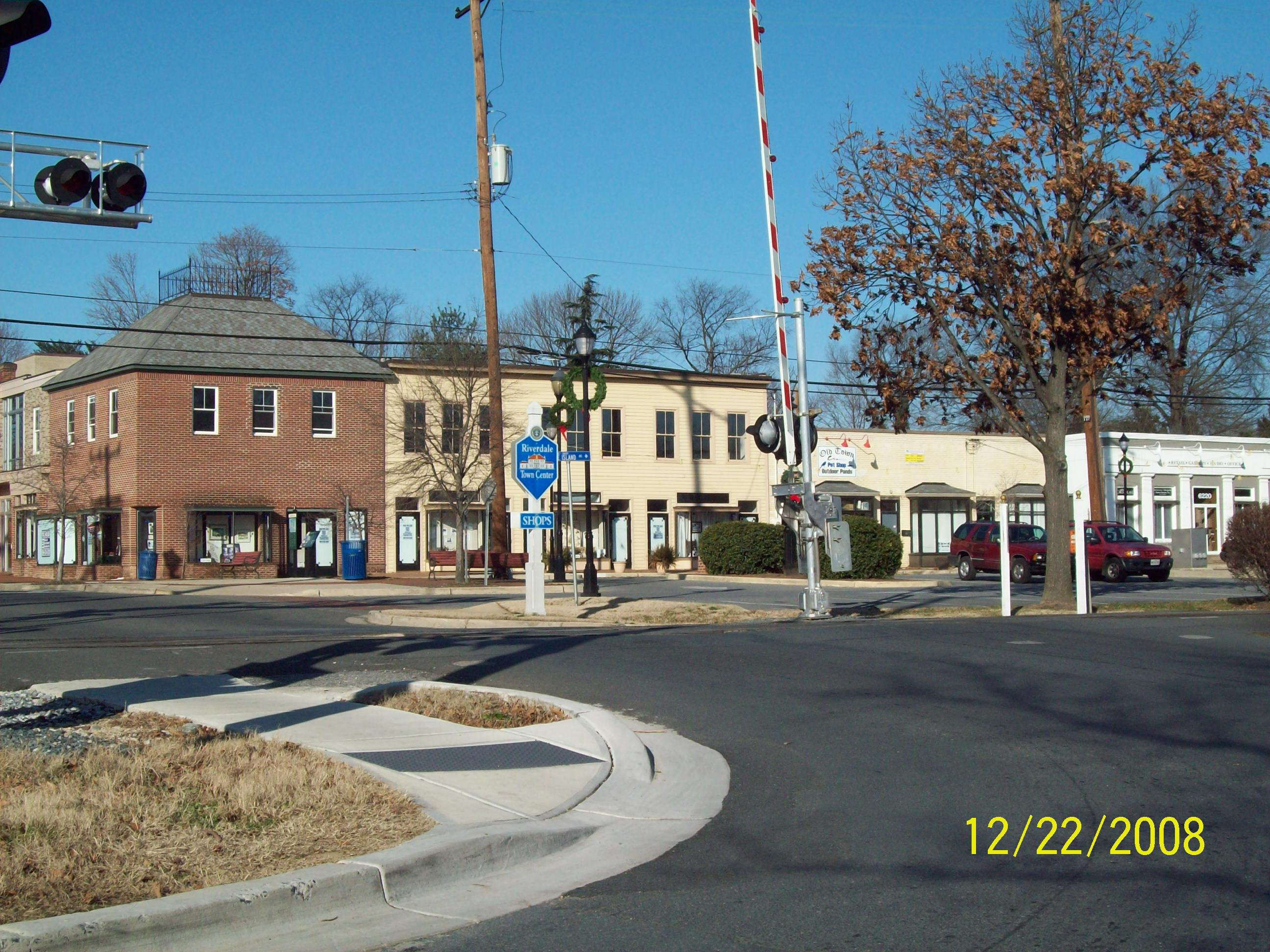
Riverdale Park Commercial Area, December 2008
