= Clagett House at Cool Spring Manor =

Historic house in Maryland, United States

- U.S. National Register of Historic Places
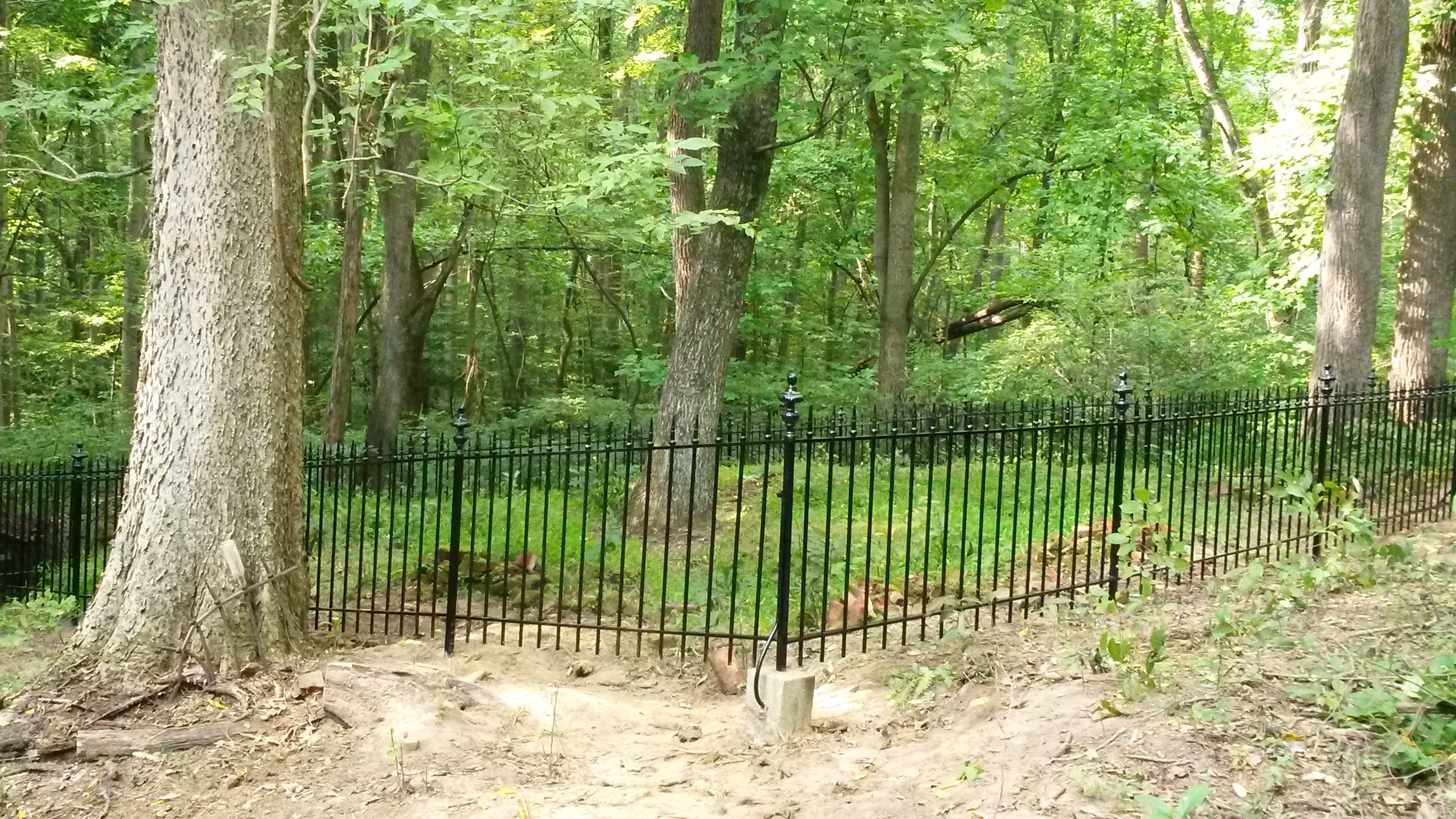
- Cemetery near the house

- Location within Maryland Location within the United States
- Nearest city: Upper Marlboro, Maryland
- Coordinates: 38°52′23″N 76°41′54″W
- Built: ca. 1830
- Architectural style: Greek Revival
- NRHP reference No.: 11000322
- Added to NRHP: June 3, 2011

The Clagett House at Cool Spring Manor is a historic house in Prince George's County, Maryland, built around 1830 by William Digges Clagett on the family's Cool Spring Manor property. Constructed in a style more typical of the Deep South, it is a hip roofed wood frame dwelling standing on a brick foundation.

== Layout ==
The upper floor consists of a wide central hall with two bedrooms on one side and two parlours on the other; each room has a fireplace with its own chimney rising straight through the roof. The basement floor, which projects halfway out of the ground, contained the original kitchen, a summer bedroom and a pantry; later a kitchen was made on the upper floor by walling off the back section of the hall. Porches run the full length of the north side of the house and partway across the south side.

Near the house are a small family burial plot, and various more recent outbuildings including a couple of 20th century barns. The house has stayed in the family, but after 1917 the property was farmed by tenants, and the house is now unoccupied. This house is the only example of this form in Prince George's County and one of the very few such in the state; "Arden" in Anne Arundel County is one of the few similar structures in Maryland.

== Register ==
The house was added to the National Register of Historic Places in 2011. This home was also owned by Edward Reynolds Owens the son of James Owens.
