= List of Delta Sigma Phi chapters =

Delta Sigma Phi is a fraternity founded in 1899 at City College of New York. It was the first fraternity based on religious and ethnic acceptance. The fraternity originally named its chapters based on location, but changed to a Greek alphabet system in 1906.

== Undergraduate chapters ==
In the following charter-date ordered list, active chapters are indicated in bold and Inactive chapters and institutions are in italics.

Chapter	Charter date and range	Institution	Location	Status	Ref.
Alpha	December 10, 1899 – January 1, 1935	City College of New York	New York City, New York	Inactive	
Benedictine	January 1, 1900 – January 1, 1980	Benedictine College	Atchison, Kansas	Inactive	
Beta	January 1, 1901 – 1941; 2001 – January 14, 2021	Columbia University	New York City, New York	Inactive	
Gamma	January 2, 1904 – January 1, 1935	New York University	New York City, New York	Inactive	
Delta	January 7, 1905 – May 11, 1908	Massachusetts Institute of Technology	Cambridge, Massachusetts	Inactive	
**Epsilon**	May 26, 1905 – 1908; 1920–2000; 2007–2018; 2019	Pennsylvania State University	State College, Pennsylvania	Active	(Note: Chapter formed from Zeta Zeta (local), established in 1914. After going dormant, it reformed in 2007 from Delta Sigma, established in 2000.) (Note: Chapter reformed as a colony in 2019.)
Zeta	January 4, 1906 – January 1, 1914	Washington and Lee University	Lexington, Virginia	Inactive	
**Eta**	May 9, 1907 – 1932; 1939–1964; 1971	University of Texas at Austin	Austin, Texas	Active	
Theta	May 18, 1907 – 1910; 1923 – January 1, 1944	Cornell University	Ithaca, New York	Inactive	(Note: Chapter formed from Omega Pi Alpha, established in 1905.)
Iota	May 5, 1908 – 1942; xxxx ? – July 1, 2015	University of Pennsylvania	Philadelphia, Pennsylvania	Inactive	(Note: Chapter formed from Kappa Phi, established in 1912.)
**Kappa**	November 28, 1908 – 1911; 1921 – December 11, 2017	Auburn University	Auburn, Alabama	Colony	
Lambda (First)	1910–1915	Trinity University	San Antonio, Texas	Inactive, Reassigned	
Mu	December 24, 1910 – January 1, 1932	University of Chicago	Chicago, Illinois	Inactive	
Nu	December 24, 1910 – January 1, 1999	Waynesburg University	Waynesburg, Pennsylvania	Inactive	(Note: The chapter closed when the university banned fraternal organizations.)
Xi				Unassigned	
Omicron (First)	1912–1918	Cumberland University	Lebanon, Tennessee	Inactive, Reassigned	
Pi	April 1, 1915 – 1916; 1930–1940; 1948 – January 1, 1953	Furman University	Greenville, South Carolina	Inactive	(Note: Chapter formed from Sigma Phi Delta, established in the 1920s. After going dormant, it reformed in 1948 from Chi Phi Chi, established in 1947.)
**Rho**	May 20, 1915 – 1954; 1957–2017; 2021	North Carolina State University	Raleigh, North Carolina	Active	(Note: Chapter formed from Gamma Alpha Nu, established in 1913.)
Sigma	June 5, 1915 – 2000; 2002 – January 1, 2021	Thiel College	Greenville, Pennsylvania	Inactive	(Note: Chapter formed from Delta Theta Chi, established in 1910.)
**Tau**	June 6, 1915	Hillsdale College	Hillsdale, Michigan	Active	(Note: Chapter formed from Mu Epsilon Delta, established in 1913.) (Note: Beginning with the Tau chapter, many chapters chartered in Michigan were established with Tau as part of their chapter name. Due to this tradition, a few chapters were established out of date to accommodate this tradition. Furthermore, there is no chapter with the name Eta Tau, perhaps due to the lack of an expected or future chartering in Michigan that never came to fruition.)
Upsilon	October 23, 1915 – November 8, 2015	Franklin & Marshall College	Lancaster, Pennsylvania	Inactive	(Note: Chapter formed from the Franco Club, established in 1912.)
**Lambda (Second)**	October 25, 1915 – 1983; 2023	Southern Methodist University	Dallas, Texas	Colony	(Note: Chapter reformed as a colony in 2023.)
**Hilgard**	November 21, 1915 – 1933; 1947–1972; 1976–1998; 2012 – July 14, 2020; 2024	University of California, Berkeley	Berkeley, California	Active	(Note: Chapter formed from the Hilgard Club, established in 1900 and named in honor of Professor E. W. Hilgard, who was instrumental in its founding. This, this chapter did not receive a Greek letter name.) (Note: Chapter reformed as a colony in 2024.)
Phi	February 15, 1916 – 1932; 1954–1970; 1984 – February 11, 2013	Saint Louis University	St. Louis, Missouri	Inactive	(Note: After going dormant, the chapter was reformed in 1954 from Kappa Sigma Kappa, established in 1950.)
Chi	March 11, 1916 – January 1, 1963	Tulane University	New Orleans, Louisiana	Inactive	
Psi	April 18, 1916 – January 1, 1982	Wofford College	Spartanburg, South Carolina	Inactive	
**Omega**	April 27, 1916 – 1933; 1947–2003; 2016	University of Pittsburgh	Pittsburgh, Pennsylvania	Active	(Note: Chapter formed from Alpha Phi, established in 1912.)
**Alpha Tau**	June 15, 1917	Albion College	Albion, Michigan	Active	(Note: Chapter formed from the Forum Club, established in 1906.)
Alpha Alpha	May 24, 1919 – 2000; 2006 – April 10, 2018	University of Illinois at Urbana–Champaign	Champaign, Illinois	Inactive	(Note: Chapter formed from Beta Upsilon, established in 1910.)
**Alpha Gamma**	January 10, 1920 – 1997; 2002	Georgia Tech	Atlanta, Georgia	Active	(Note: Chapter formed from the Soldiers Club, established in 1918.)
**Alpha Delta**	January 24, 1920 – 1933; 1986–2001; 2005–2019	University of North Carolina at Chapel Hill	Chapel Hill, North Carolina	Colony	(Note: Chapter formed from the Crowd Society, established in 1917.) (Note: Chapter reformed as a colony in 2020.)
Alpha Epsilon	February 7, 1920 – August 1, 2019	Duke University	Durham, North Carolina	Inactive	(Note: Chapter formed from the Stag Club, established in 1919.)
Alpha Zeta	February 14, 1920 – January 1, 2002	Alfred University	Alfred, New York	Inactive	(Note: Chapter formed from the Ku Klux Klan local fraternity, established in 1901, which later changed its name to Kappa Kappa Kappa. This has no known connection to the small national Ku Klux Klan (fraternity).)
**Alpha Eta**	February 14, 1920	Ohio Northern University	Ada, Ohio	Active	(Note: Chapter formed from Delta Tau Phi, established in 1914.)
Alpha Beta	April 30, 1920 – January 1, 1941	Boston University	Boston, Massachusetts	Inactive	(Note: Chapter formed from Omega Alpha, established in 1920.)
**Alpha Theta**	May 15, 1920 – 1933; 1946–1976; 1986–19xx ?; 1996–2002; 2015	University of Michigan	Ann Arbor, Michigan	Active	(Note: Chapter formed from the Knickerbockers, established in 1888.)
**Alpha Iota**	May 29, 1920 – 1942; 1947–1971; 1988–1996; 2013	Ohio State University	Columbus, Ohio	Active	(Note: Chapter formed from Alpha Chi Alpha, established in 1919.)
**Alpha Kappa**	June 21, 1920 – 1932; 1948–1952	University of Wisconsin–Madison	Madison, Wisconsin	Colony	(Note: Chapter formed from Tau Delta Phi, established in 1918.) (Note: Chapter reformed as a colony in 2021.)
**Alpha Lambda**	April 16, 1921 – 1998; 2000	Millikin University	Decatur, Illinois	Active	(Note: Chapter formed from Tuckabee, established in 1919.)
**Alpha Mu**	April 16, 1921 – 1933; 1964	University of Virginia	Charlottesville, Virginia	Active	(Note: Chapter formed from Phi Kappa Epsilon, established in 1919.)
**Alpha Nu**	May 14, 1921 – 1942; 1985–2008; 2017	Oglethorpe University	Brookhaven, Georgia	Active	(Note: Chapter formed from Alpha Omega, established in 1919.)
Alpha Omicron	April 1, 1922 – January 1, 1971	McGill University	Montreal, Quebec, Canada	Inactive	(Note: Chapter formed from Phi Nu, established in 1920.)
**Alpha Pi**	January 13, 1923	Michigan State University	East Lansing, Michigan	Active	(Note: Chapter formed from the Aurorian, established in 1905.)
**Alpha Rho**	May 3, 1924 – 1964; 1988–1996	University of Colorado Boulder	Boulder, Colorado	Colony	(Note: Chapter formed from Phintia, established in 1922.)
**Alpha Sigma**	May 24, 1924	University of Maryland, College Park	College Park, Maryland	Active	(Note: Chapter formed from Sigma Tau Alpha, established in 1919.)
**Alpha Upsilon**	January 30, 1925 – 1941; 1947	Kansas State University	Manhattan, Kansas	Active	(Note: Chapter formed from Edgerton Club, established in 1916.)
**Alpha Chi**	May 15, 1925 – 1999; 2004	Stetson University	DeLand, Florida	Active	(Note: Chapter formed from Phi Delta Kappa, established in 1898.)
Alpha Phi	May 16, 1925 – January 1, 1999	University of Southern California	Los Angeles, California	Inactive	(Note: Chapter formed from Mu Sigma Phi, established in 1921.)
**Alpha Psi**	October 24, 1925 – 1934; 1949–1984; 2021	University of Nebraska–Lincoln	Lincoln, Nebraska	Colony	(Note: Chapter formed from Delta Sigma, established in 1912.)
Alpha Omega	November 7, 1926 – 1939; 1947–1959	University of Washington	Seattle, Washington	Inactive	(Note: Chapter formed from Chi Sigma Alpha, established in 1921.)
**Beta Alpha**	March 12, 1927 – 2003; 2016	Iowa State University	Ames, Iowa	Active	(Note: Chapter formed from the El Paso Club, established in 1911.)
**Beta Beta**	November 12, 1927 – 1935; 1957–1994; 2001 – December 31, 2020	University of Missouri	Columbia, Missouri	Colony	(Note: Chapter formed from Alpha Chi, established in 1924.)
**Beta Gamma**	November 27, 1927	University of California, Los Angeles	Los Angeles, California	Active	(Note: Chapter formed from Chi Sigma Phi, established in 1926.)
Beta Delta	March 16, 1928 – January 1, 1961	Birmingham–Southern College	Birmingham, Alabama	Inactive	(Note: Chapter formed from Phi Alpha, established in 1921.)
**Beta Epsilon**	May 5, 1928 – 1970; 1975–1985	Oregon State University	Corvallis, Oregon	Colony	(Note: Chapter formed from Theta Nu Phi, established in 1920.)
**Beta Zeta**	April 20, 1930 – 1941; 1949–1973; 1983–1992; 2019	University of Florida	Gainesville, Florida	Active	(Note: Chapter formed from Phi Alpha Epsilon, established in 1927.)
Beta Eta	October 25, 1930 – 1974; 1995 – January 1, 2005	Louisiana State University	Baton Rouge, Louisiana	Inactive	(Note: Chapter formed from Phi Delta Sigma, established in 1925.)
Omicron (Second)	April 11, 1931 – January 1, 1960	University of Tennessee	Knoxville, Tennessee	Inactive	(Note: Chapter formed from Chi Beta Phi, established in 1927.)
Beta Theta	February 27, 1932 – 1985; 1990 – January 1, 2008	Lehigh University	Bethlehem, Pennsylvania	Inactive	(Note: Chapter formed from Sigma Iota, established in 1923.)
**Beta Iota**	April 9, 1932 – 2009; 2015	Wittenberg University	Springfield, Ohio	Active	(Note: Chapter formed from Alpha Theta Alpha, established in 1922.)
**Beta Kappa**	May 6, 1933 – 1958; 1984–1996; 2011–2018; 2023	University of Alabama	Tuscaloosa, Alabama	Active	(Note: Chapter formed from Phi Alpha Phi, established in 1928.)
Beta Lambda	May 15, 1938 – 1952; 1956 – January 1, 2001	Wake Forest University	Winston-Salem, North Carolina	Inactive	(Note: Chapter formed from Alpha Pi Delta, established in 1924.)
**Beta Mu**	October 19, 1941	Transylvania University	Lexington, Kentucky	Active	(Note: Chapter formed from Alpha Lambda Tau, established in 1929.)
**Beta Nu**	February 8, 1947 – 1973; 1991	California State University, Fresno	Fresno, California	Active	(Note: Chapter formed from the Delta Sigma Club (local), established in 1946.)
Alpha Xi	June 7, 1947 – 1972; 1991 – January 1, 1997	University of New Mexico	Albuquerque, New Mexico	Inactive	(Note: The name Alpha Xi chapter was originally missed in the naming structure, perhaps because the Hilgard chapter at UC Berkeley would have been named Xi chapter had the customary naming process been followed about that chapter. It wasn't until 25 years later that a correction was made and the designation Alpha Xi was issued to the University of New Mexico. This is why the chapter name comes up out of chronological order.)
Beta Xi	February 8, 1948 – January 1, 1963	University of California, Santa Barbara	Santa Barbara, California	Inactive	
Beta Omicron	February 22, 1948 – 1973; 1986 – January 1, 2000	Central Michigan University	Mount Pleasant, Michigan	Inactive	
**Beta Pi**	March 7, 1948	Michigan Technological University	Houghton, Michigan	Active	
Beta Rho	April 4, 1948 – January 1, 1993	Hartwick College	Oneonta, New York	Inactive	(Note: Chapter formed from Alpha Epsilon Kappa, established in 1946.)
**Beta Tau**	May 15, 1948 – 1976; 1986–2015	Western Michigan University	Kalamazoo, Michigan	Colony	
Beta Sigma	May 16, 1948 – January 1, 1954	Louisiana Tech University	Ruston, Louisiana	Inactive	(Note: Chapter formed from Delta Kappa Alpha, established in 1947.)
Beta Phi	May 30, 1948 – January 1, 2009	Saint Francis University	Loretto, Pennsylvania	Inactive	(Note: Chapter formed from Alpha Epsilon Kappa, established in 1946.)
Beta Upsilon	June 6, 1948 – January 1, 1974	University of Louisiana at Lafayette	Lafayette, Louisiana	Inactive	(Note: Chapter formed from Omega Delta Phi, established in 1931.)
Beta Chi	October 17, 1948 – 1953; 1953 – January 1, 1966	Samford University	Homewood, Alabama	Inactive	
Beta Omega	November 14, 1948 – 1963; 1999 – January 23, 2023	University of Arizona	Tucson, Arizona	Inactive	(Note: Chapter formed from Delta Sigma, established in 1947.)
**Beta Psi**	November 14, 1948 – 2009; 2014	Arizona State University	Tempe, Arizona	Active	(Note: Chapter formed from Pi Delta Sigma, established in 1931.)
**Gamma Alpha**	November 14, 1948 – 2009; 2013–2014; 2017	San Diego State University	San Diego, California	Active	(Note: Chapter originated as Alpha Chi (local), established in 1947.)
Gamma Beta	March 6, 1949 – January 1, 1953	University of Arkansas	Fayetteville, Arkansas	Inactive	
Gamma Gamma	May 22, 1949 – January 1, 1959	University of Miami	Coral Gables, Florida	Inactive	
**Gamma Delta**	June 4, 1949 – 2014; 2021	Washington State University	Pullman, Washington	Active	
**Gamma Epsilon**	June 19, 1949 – 1973; 1984–1994; 2009	San Jose State University	San Jose, California	Active	
Gamma Zeta	December 10, 1949 – 199x ?; 2010 – July 1, 2019	Rutgers University	New Jersey	Inactive	
Gamma Eta	May 21, 1950 – January 1, 1960	Washington University in St. Louis	St. Louis, Missouri	Inactive	(Note: Chapter formed from Sigma Club, established in 1950.)
Gamma Theta	May 28, 1950 – January 1, 1993	University of Detroit Mercy	Detroit, Michigan	Inactive	
**Gamma Iota**	May 28, 1950	University of Idaho	Moscow, Idaho	Active	
Gamma Kappa	October 8, 1950 – March 15, 2015	Western Illinois University	Macomb, Illinois	Inactive	(Note: Chapter formed from Beta Delta, established in 1949.)
Gamma Lambda	December 16, 1950 – January 1, 1952	University of Nevada, Reno	Reno, Nevada	Inactive	
Gamma Mu	March 3, 1951 – January 1, 1964	University of Toronto	Toronto, Ontario, Canada	Inactive	
Gamma Nu	May 18, 1952 – 1974; 19xx ? – January 1, 1984	Northern Arizona University	Flagstaff, Arizona	Inactive	(Note: Chapter formed from Pi Kappa Epsilon, established in 1931.)
**Gamma Xi**	November 1, 1952	University of North Texas	Denton, Texas	Active	(Note: Chapter formed from Sigma Phi Nu, established in 1946.)
Gamma Tau	November 9, 1952 – 2006; 2012 – February 26, 2021	Eastern Michigan University	Ypsilanti, Michigan	Inactive	
Gamma Omicron	April 25, 1953 – February 5, 2014	Fort Hays State University	Hays, Kansas	Inactive	(Note: Chapter formed from Gamma Tau, established in 1951.)
Gamma Pi	April 26, 1953 – May 15, 2014	Indiana University of Pennsylvania	Indiana, Pennsylvania	Inactive	(Note: Chapter formed from Delta Sigma Chi, established in 1950.)
Gamma Phi	May 2, 1954 – January 1, 1972	Alma College	Alma, Michigan	Inactive	(Note: Chapter formed from Zeta Sigma, established in 1989.)
**Gamma Upsilon**	May 2, 1954	South Dakota School of Mines and Technology	Rapid City, South Dakota	Active	(Note: Chapter formed from Alpha Tau Alpha, established in 1952.)
**Gamma Rho**	May 9, 1954 – 199x ?; 2009	Gannon University	Erie, Pennsylvania	Active	
Gamma Sigma	May 9, 1954 – 1971; 1978 – August 25, 2015	University of California, Davis	Davis, California	Inactive	
**Gamma Chi**	March 11, 1956 – 2008; 2013	Drexel University	Philadelphia, Pennsylvania	Active	(Note: Chapter formed from Psi Omega, established in 1953.)
Gamma Psi	May 6, 1956 – January 9, 2015	Morningside University	Sioux City, Iowa	Inactive	(Note: Chapter formed from Gamma Iota, established in 1946.)
Gamma Omega	May 13, 1956 – 1980; 1985 – January 1, 1997	University of Houston	Houston, Texas	Inactive	(Note: Chapter formed from Delta Theta, established in 1948.)
**Delta Beta**	May 14, 1956 – 1964; 1988 – January 1, 1992	University of Oklahoma	Norman, Oklahoma	Colony	
Delta Alpha	May 20, 1956 – January 1, 2002	California State University, Chico	Chico, California	Inactive	(Note: Chapter formed from Chi Tau, established in 1939.)
Ryerson	December 31, 1956 – January 1, 1972	Toronto Metropolitan University	Toronto, Ontario, Canada	Inactive	(Note: Chapter was formed at the Ryerson Institute of Technology, now Toronto Metropolitan University.)
**Delta Delta**	February 16, 1957	Purdue University	West Lafayette, Indiana	Active	(Note: Chapter formed from the Luma Coop, established in 1956.)
**Delta Epsilon**	March 10, 1957 – 1994; 2008	Missouri University of Science and Technology	Rolla, Missouri	Active	
Delta Zeta	April 7, 1957 – March 23, 2014	High Point University	High Point, North Carolina	Inactive	(Note: Chapter formed from N.D.M., established in the 1950s.)
Delta Gamma	May 19, 1957 – 1970	University of Kansas	Lawrence, Kansas	Inactive	
Delta Eta	May 25, 1957 – January 1, 1993	Montana State University	Bozeman, Montana	Inactive	
Delta Theta	May 26, 1957 – January 1, 1971	University of Montana	Missoula, Montana	Inactive	(Note: Chapter started as a colony in 1951.)
Delta Iota	March 16, 1958 – January 1, 1997	Barton College	Wilson, North Carolina	Inactive	(Note: Chapter formed from Phi Kappa Alpha, established in 1925.)
**Delta Mu**	October 19, 1958 – 1994; 2014	Loyola Marymount University	Los Angeles, California	Active	(Note: Chapter formed from Sigma Phi Zeta, established in 1926.)
Delta Kappa	November 6, 1958 – 1971; 1989 – 1998	California State Polytechnic University, Humboldt	Arcata, California	Inactive	
Delta Nu	January 11, 1959 – 1976; 1992–199x ?	Edinboro University of Pennsylvania	Edinboro, Pennsylvania	Inactive	(Note: Chapter formed from Delta Sigma Tau, established in 1957.)
Delta Lambda	April 4, 1959 – 1972; 1992–2023	Utah State University	Logan, Utah	Inactive	
Delta Omicron	December 6, 1959 – 1997; 2005 – January 23, 2023	Western Carolina University	Cullowhee, North Carolina	Inactive	(Note: Chapter formed from Gamma Tau, established in 1957.)
Delta Xi	December 6, 1959 – 1966	East Texas A&M University	Commerce, Texas	Inactive	(Note: Chapter formed from Friars, established by 1929.) (Note: Texas A&M University at Commerce changed its name to East Texas A&M University on November 7, 2024.)
Delta Pi	December 6, 1960 – September 30, 2011	Stephen F. Austin State University	Nacogdoches, Texas	Inactive	(Note: Chapter formed from the Sawyer Club, established in 1927.)
Delta Rho	February 19, 1962 – 1989; xxxx ? – January 1, 2001	St. Mary's University, Texas	San Antonio, Texas	Inactive	(Note: Chapter formed from Kappa Theta Chi, established in 1954.)
Delta Tau	April 28, 1962 – January 1, 2009	Ferris State University	Big Rapids, Michigan	Inactive	(Note: Chapter formed from Pi Sigma Tau Alpha, established in 1928.)
Delta Sigma	May 6, 1962 – 1975; 1993 – January 1, 1996	Youngstown State University	Youngstown, Ohio	Inactive	(Note: Chapter formed from Tau Omega, established in 1957.)
Delta Upsilon	May 13, 1962 – 1976; 1985 – January 1, 1995	Northern Michigan University	Marquette, Michigan	Inactive	(Note: Chapter formed from Theta Omicron Rho, established in 1914.)
Delta Phi	October 28, 1962 – January 1, 2000	California University of Pennsylvania	California, Pennsylvania	Inactive	(Note: Chapter formed from Sigma Phi, established in 1959.)
Delta Psi	May 6, 1963 – January 1, 2008	Eastern Illinois University	Charleston, Illinois	Inactive	
Delta Chi	May 18, 1963 – January 1, 1973	Lambuth University	Jackson, Tennessee	Inactive	(Note: Chapter formed from Theta Psi, established in 1930.)
**Delta Omega**	May 26, 1963 – 1991; 2005	Cleveland State University	Cleveland, Ohio	Active	(Note: Chapter formed from Pi Sigma Tau, established in 1928. After going dormant, it reformed in 2005 from Delta Omega (local), established in 2003.)
Epsilon Alpha	March 27, 1965 – January 1, 1972	University of Alberta	Edmonton, Alberta, Canada	Inactive	(Note: Chapter formed from Sigma Tau Alpha, established in 1961.)
**Epsilon Beta**	May 5, 1965 – 1978; 1984	University of Wisconsin–Oshkosh	Oshkosh, Wisconsin	Active	(Note: Chapter formed from Delta Kappa, established in 1927.)
Epsilon Gamma (First)	March 27, 1966 – 1973	Parsons College	Fairfield, Iowa	Inactive, Reassigned	(Note: Chapter formed from Sigma Phi Omega. It went inactive when the college closed in 1973.)
**Epsilon Delta**	October 10, 1966	University of Wisconsin–Platteville	Platteville, Wisconsin	Active	(Note: Chapter formed from Alpha Sigma Rho, established in 1958.)
Epsilon Epsilon	April 22, 1967 – 1982; November 23, 1996– January 1, 2001	Old Dominion University	Norfolk, Virginia	Inactive	(Note: Chapter formed from Sigma Delta Phi, established in 1950.)
Epsilon Zeta	May 7, 1967 – 2000; 2004 – December 19, 2014	Clarkson University	Potsdam, New York	Inactive	(Note: Chapter formed from Karma, established in 1929. In 2000, it again became the local group Karma, returning to Delta Sigma Phi in 2004.)
Epsilon Eta	May 20, 1967 – January 1, 1973	University of Wisconsin–Whitewater	Whitewater, Wisconsin	Inactive	(Note: Chapter formed from Sigma Delta Pi, established in 1961.)
Epsilon Theta	December 4, 1967 – 1986; 19xx ? – January 1, 1997	St. John's University	New York City, New York	Inactive	(Note: Chapter formed from Pi Sigma Kappa.)
**Epsilon Iota**	December 17, 1967	University of Wisconsin–La Crosse	La Crosse, Wisconsin	Active	
**Epsilon Kappa**	May 4, 1968 – 1975; 1980–199x ?; 2014	Loyola University Chicago	Chicago, Illinois	Active	(Note: Chapter formed from Psi Delta Phi, established in 1961. After going dormant, it reformed in 1980 from Delta Sigma, established in 1975.)
Epsilon Lambda	May 11, 1968 – January 23, 2023	Northwest Missouri State University	Maryville, Missouri	Inactive	(Note: Chapter formed from Phi Lambda Chi, established in 1959.)
Epsilon Mu	May 18, 1968 – January 1, 1973	University of Wyoming	Laramie, Wyoming	Inactive	
Epsilon Nu	September 27, 1968 – January 1, 1990	Monmouth University	West Long Branch, New Jersey	Inactive	(Note: Chapter formed from Theta Epsilon Chi, established in 1961.)
Epsilon Xi	September 27, 1968 – 1970; 19xx ? – January 1, 1986	Seton Hall University	South Orange, New Jersey	Inactive	
Epsilon Omicron	November 3, 1968 – January 1, 1974	University of Wisconsin–Stevens Point	Stevens Point, Wisconsin	Inactive	(Note: Chapter formed from Delta Sigma, established in 1966)
Epsilon Pi	January 24, 1969 – 19xx ?; 199x ?–2023	Woodbury University	Burbank, California	Inactive	(Note: Chapter formed from Phi Sigma Nu, established in 1933.)
**Epsilon Rho**	January 25, 1969 – April 10, 2018	California Polytechnic State University, San Luis Obispo	San Luis Obispo, California	Colony	(Note: Chapter formed as a colony in 1949.)
Epsilon Sigma	May 3, 1969 – 1979; 1987 – January 1, 2006	University of Nevada, Las Vegas	Paradise, Nevada	Inactive	
Epsilon Upsilon	November 1, 1970 – January 1, 1997	Nicholls State University	Thibodaux, Louisiana	Inactive	
**Epsilon Phi**	April 23, 1971	East Carolina University	Greenville, North Carolina	Active	(Note: Chapter formed from Phi Alpha Sigma, established in 1967.)
Epsilon Chi	April 25, 1971 – January 1, 1975	Valdosta State University	Valdosta, Georgia	Inactive	
Epsilon Tau	May 1, 1971 – 1976; 1990 – June 21, 2021	Grand Valley State University	Allendale, Michigan	Inactive	(Note: Chapter formed from Lambda Chi, established in 1967.)
Epsilon Psi	November 12, 1971 – 1974; 19xx ? – January 1, 1980	Bryant University	Smithfield, Rhode Island	Inactive	(Note: Chapter formed from Chi Gamma Iota, established in 1947.)
**Epsilon Omega**	December 18, 1971 – 19xx ?; 1997 – April 17, 2015, August 2025 – Present	Illinois State University	Normal, Illinois	Active	(Note: Chapter formed from Sigma Tau Alpha.)
Zeta Alpha	February 25, 1972 – 1976; 1980 – January 1, 1998	New York Institute of Technology	Old Westbury, New York	Inactive	(Note: Chapter formed from Xi Iota Phi, established in 1967. After going dormant, it reformed in 1980 from Delta Sigma (local), established in 1976.)
Zeta Beta	September 15, 1973 – January 1, 1993	Murray State University	Murray, Kentucky	Inactive	(Note: Chapter formed from Sigma Epsilon Phi, established in 1968.)
Zeta Gamma	October 20, 1973 – January 1, 1998	Valparaiso University	Valparaiso, Indiana	Inactive	
Zeta Delta	January 31, 1976 – January 1, 1992	Louisiana State University Shreveport	Shreveport, Louisiana	Inactive	
Zeta Epsilon	April 16, 1977 – January 1, 1992	California State University, Fullerton	Fullerton, California	Inactive	(Note: Chapter formed as a colony in 1968.)
**Zeta Zeta**	April 16, 1977 – 19xx ?; 1984–2021	Texas Tech University	Lubbock, Texas	Colony	
Zeta Eta	April 16, 1977 – January 1, 1986	Sam Houston State University	Huntsville, Texas	Inactive	
Zeta Theta	October 21, 1979 – January 1, 1982	Colorado State University Pueblo	Pueblo, Colorado	Inactive	
Zeta Iota	April 10, 1981 – January 1, 1993	University of Rochester	Rochester, New York	Inactive	(Note: Chapter formed as a colony in 1977.)
**Zeta Kappa**	October 24, 1981 – 199x ?; 2010	University of Northern Colorado	Greeley, Colorado	Active	
**Zeta Lambda**	April 23, 1982	Rose–Hulman Institute of Technology	Terre Haute, Indiana	Active	
Zeta Mu	September 18, 1982 – January 1, 1990	Longwood University	Farmville, Virginia	Inactive	
**Zeta Nu**	December 4, 1982 – 1990; 2016	Missouri State University	Springfield, Missouri	Active	
**Zeta Xi**	April 9, 1983	St. Cloud State University	St. Cloud, Minnesota	Active	
California State, Northridge	1984 – January 1, 1991; March 30, 1999 – xxxx ?	California State University, Northridge	Los Angeles, California	Inactive	
Zeta Omicron	February 24, 1984 – February 4, 2013	California State University, East Bay	Hayward, California	Inactive	
Zeta Rho	April 4, 1984 – January 1, 1986	Auraria Campus	Denver, Colorado	Inactive	
**Zeta Pi**	April 13, 1984 – 2010; 2015	University of Louisiana at Monroe	Monroe, Louisiana	Active	
Zeta Tau	April 27, 1984 – January 1, 2009	Lake Superior State University	Sault Ste. Marie, Michigan	Inactive	
Zeta Sigma	November 16, 1984 – 199x ?; 200x ? – January 22, 2013	University of California, San Diego	San Diego, California	Inactive	
Epsilon Gamma (Second)	1984 – January 1, 1992	Peru State College	Peru, Nebraska	Inactive	
Zeta Upsilon	March 30, 1985 – February 27, 2020	Eureka College	Eureka, Illinois	Inactive	
Wayne State	January 1, 1986 – January 1, 1992	Wayne State University	Detroit, Michigan	Inactive	
Zeta Phi	February 14, 1986 – January 1, 1992	Slippery Rock University	Slippery Rock, Pennsylvania	Inactive	
**Zeta Chi**	February 15, 1986	University of Alabama at Birmingham	Birmingham, Alabama	Active	
Zeta Psi	April 5, 1986 – September 13, 2001	State University of New York at Brockport	Brockport, New York	Inactive	
**Zeta Omega**	November 8, 1986 – 1993; 2014	University of North Carolina Wilmington	Wilmington, North Carolina	Active	(Note: Chapter formed from Sigma Delta Psi, established in 1985.)
Eta Alpha	January 22, 1987 – August 1, 2021	Milwaukee School of Engineering	Milwaukee, Wisconsin	Inactive	(Note: Chapter formed from Gamma Delta Pi, established in 1987.)
**Eta Beta**	February 25, 1987	California State University, San Bernardino	San Bernardino, California	Active	
Eta Gamma	March 12, 1987 – January 1, 2001	East Stroudsburg University of Pennsylvania	East Stroudsburg, Pennsylvania	Inactive	(Note: Chapter formed from Sigma Chi Delta, established in 1983.)
Eta Delta	April 11, 1987 – January 1, 1991	Florida Institute of Technology	Melbourne, Florida	Inactive	
Eta Epsilon	April 11, 1987 – January 1, 1998	Northern Illinois University	DeKalb, Illinois	Inactive	
Eta Zeta	April 24, 1987 – January 1, 1997	University of La Verne	La Verne, California	Inactive	(Note: Chapter formed from Lambda Chi, established in 1969.)
Eta Theta	May 16, 1987 – January 1, 1992	Aurora University	Aurora, Illinois	Inactive	
**Eta Eta**	May 29, 1987 – 2008; 2018	Rochester Institute of Technology	Rochester, New York	Active	(Note: Chapter formed from Zeta Pi Mu, established in 1981.)
Eta Iota	October 17, 1987 – January 1, 1991	California State University, Sacramento	Sacramento, California	Inactive	
Eta Kappa	November 4, 1987 – May 18, 2020	University of Michigan–Dearborn	Dearborn, Michigan	Inactive	
**Eta Lambda**	March 10, 1989 – 199x ?; 2024	Chapman University	Orange, California	Active	
Eta Mu	April 15, 1989 – January 1, 1996	New York Institute of Technology, Central Islip	Suffolk County, New York	Inactive	
Eta Nu	November 1, 1989 – January 1, 2003	Sonoma State University	Rohnert Park, California	Inactive	
**Eta Xi**	November 26, 1989 – 2015	Towson University	Towson, Maryland	Colony	(Note: Chapter reformed as a colony in 2018.)
**Eta Omicron**	December 2, 1989	University of Wisconsin–Eau Claire	Eau Claire, Wisconsin	Active	
Eta Pi	April 6, 1990 – February 9, 1992	University of Dayton	Dayton, Ohio	Inactive	
**Eta Rho**	April 14, 1990 – 2010; October 12, 2015	University of North Carolina at Charlotte	Charlotte, North Carolina	Active	
Eta Sigma	November 3, 1990 – January 1, 1994	California State Polytechnic University, Pomona	Pomona, California	Inactive	
Eta Tau				Unassigned	
**Eta Upsilon**	September 8, 1990 – 2008; 2017	Indiana State University	Terre Haute, Indiana	Active	
Eta Phi	November 3, 1990 – January 1, 2009	Southern Illinois University Carbondale	Carbondale, Illinois	Inactive	
Eta Chi	January 12, 1991 – 2010; 201x ? – April 10, 2018	New Mexico State University	Las Cruces, New Mexico	Inactive	
Eta Psi	April 13, 1991 – July 12, 2016	Gallaudet University	Washington, D.C.	Inactive	
Theta Alpha	June 7, 1991 – January 1, 1996	North Carolina Wesleyan College	Rocky Mount, North Carolina	Inactive	(Note: Chapter formed from Alpha Delta Chi, established in 1966.)
Eta Omega	November 15, 1991 – 2016; 20xx ? – January 1, 2021	Johnson & Wales University	Providence, Rhode Island	Inactive	
Theta Beta	February 15, 1992 – January 1, 1993	Albright College	Reading, Pennsylvania	Inactive	(Note: Chapter formed from Pi Tau Beta, established in 1907.)
Theta Delta	December 11, 1992 – January 1, 2008	Hofstra University	Hempstead and Uniondale, New York	Inactive	
**Theta Epsilon**	March 27, 1993	Wingate University	Wingate, North Carolina	Active	
Theta Gamma	May 5, 1993 – July 12, 2016	Stony Brook University	Stony Brook, New York	Inactive	
**Iota Phi**	December 31, 1993 – xxxx ?; 2022	University of Minnesota	Minneapolis, Minnesota	Active	
Theta Zeta	April 17, 1993 – 2004; 2011 – October 21, 2013	Colorado State University	Fort Collins, Colorado	Inactive	
**Theta Eta**	February 5, 1994 – 199x ?; 2017	Texas State University	San Marcos, Texas	Active	
**Theta Theta**	April 16, 1994	University of Hartford	West Hartford, Connecticut	Active	
Theta Iota	May 5, 1994 – January 1, 2002	Quinnipiac University	Hamden, Connecticut	Inactive	
California, Irvine	December 31, 1994 – October 14, 2020	University of California, Irvine	Irvine, California	Inactive	
Theta Kappa	April 22, 1995 – May 15, 2021	State University of New York at Oswego	Oswego, New York	Inactive	
**Theta Lambda**	April 29, 1995	Dickinson College	Carlisle, Pennsylvania	Active	
**Theta Upsilon**	October 1, 1995 – xxxx ?; 2002–2013; 2015–2017; 2023	Texas A&M University	College Station, Texas	Active	
**Theta Mu**	April 13, 1996	University of Kentucky	Lexington, Kentucky	Active	
Theta Nu	March 1, 1997 – March 17, 2010	Idaho State University	Pocatello, Idaho	Inactive	
**Theta Xi**	April 19, 1997 – 1994; 1995–1997; 2022	Florida State University	Tallahassee, Florida	Active	(Note: Chapter reformed as a colony in 2022.)
Theta Omicron	April 18, 1998 – January 1, 2008	Shawnee State University	Portsmouth, Ohio	Inactive	
**Theta Pi**	May 2, 1998 – 200x ?	University of Massachusetts Amherst	Amherst, Massachusetts	Colony	
Theta Rho	May 9, 1998 – xxxx ?	University of Oregon	Eugene, Oregon	Inactive	
**Kappa Delta**	March 20, 1999	Virginia Tech	Blacksburg, Virginia	Active	(Note: Kappa Delta chapter was named in honor of Karen Decker, wife of past national president Thomas Decker, who was instrumental in the establishment of the chapter at Virginia Tech.)
**Theta Sigma**	October 14, 2000	La Salle University	Philadelphia, Pennsylvania	Active	(Note: Chapter formed from Iota Eta Pi, established in 1998.)
Theta Tau	November 10, 2001 – January 1, 2008	Temple University	Philadelphia, Pennsylvania	Inactive	
Theta Phi	November 16, 2002 – January 1, 2008	University of Texas at San Antonio	San Antonio, Texas	Inactive	
**Theta Chi**	October 18, 2003	University of Georgia	Athens, Georgia	Active	
Theta Psi	November 22, 2008 – January 23, 2023	Shorter University	Rome, Georgia	Inactive	
Theta Omega	November 22, 2008 – July 10, 2020	Georgia Southern University	Statesboro, Georgia	Inactive	
**Iota Alpha**	November 22, 2008	Georgia College & State University	Milledgeville, Georgia	Active	
Iota Gamma	November 5, 2011 – June 27, 2017	Indiana University South Bend	South Bend, Indiana	Inactive	
**Iota Beta**	December 3, 2011	Binghamton University	Binghamton, New York	Active	
**Iota Delta**	April 21, 2012	James Madison University	Harrisonburg, Virginia	Active	
**Iota Epsilon**	September 22, 2012	University of Central Florida	Orlando, Florida	Active	
**Iota Zeta**	December 1, 2012	Miami University	Oxford, Ohio	Active	
**Iota Eta**	September 21, 2013	Indiana University Indianapolis	Indianapolis, Indiana	Active	
**Iota Theta**	March 8, 2014	Boise State University	Boise, Idaho	Active	
**Iota Iota**	September 21, 2014	Case Western Reserve University	Cleveland, Ohio	Active	
**Iota Kappa**	December 6, 2014	University of Utah	Salt Lake City, Utah	Active	
**Iota Psi**	January 31, 2015 – November 16, 2018; 2024	Indiana University Bloomington	Bloomington, Indiana	Active	
**Iota Upsilon**	August 11, 2015	Florida International University	University Park, Florida	Active	
**Iota Lambda**	August 22, 2015	Appalachian State University	Boone, North Carolina	Active	
**Iota Mu**	April 30, 2016	Kennesaw State University	Cobb County, Georgia	Active	
**Methodist**	July 29, 2016 – 20xx ?	Methodist University	Fayetteville, North Carolina	Colony	(Note: Colony formed in 2024.)
**Iota Nu**	September 24, 2016	State University of New York at Plattsburgh	Plattsburgh, New York	Active	
**Iota Xi**	March 17, 2017	University of South Carolina Aiken	Aiken, South Carolina	Active	
Iota Omicron	September 30, 2017 – September 20, 2021	George Washington University	Washington, D.C.	Inactive	
**Iota Tau**	November 19, 2018	University of North Florida	Jacksonville, Florida	Active	
Iota Pi	November 16, 2019 – January 23, 2023	University of Texas at Tyler	Tyler, Texas	Inactive	
**Iota Rho**	March 20, 2020	Lander University	Greenwood, South Carolina	Active	
**Iota Sigma**	March 28, 2020	University of Iowa	Iowa City, Iowa	Active	
**Iota Chi**	April 27, 2026	West Virginia University	Morgantown, West Virginia	Active	
**North Georgia**		University of North Georgia, Gainesville Campus	Oakwood, Georgia	Colony	(Note: Colony formed on September 23, 2021.)

== Undergraduate chapter statistics ==
Since 1899, Delta Sigma Phi has issued 243 charters in 42 states (United States of America), Washington, D.C., and three provinces in Canada. Currently, the fraternity has active chapters and new chapters in 32 states and Washington, D.C. All three chartered chapters in Canada are now inactive.

Chapter charters by decade

Decade	Total charters
1899–1909	10
1910–1919	16
1920–1929	26
1930–1939	6
1940–1949	20
1950–1959	33
1960–1969	27
1970–1979	14
1980–1989	31
1990–1999	26
2000–2009	8
2010–2019	16
2020–to date	6

Active chapters location state (top ranking)

States	Active charters	Total charters
North Carolina	8	10
Pennsylvania	6	8
Michigan	8	15
California	7	7
Ohio	6	6
Georgia	5	6
Indiana	5	6
New York	4	6
Wisconsin	5	8
Illinois	4	5
Texas	4	4

Chapters by state (US)

State	Total charters
Alabama	5
Arizona	3
Arkansas	1
California	24
Colorado	6
Connecticut	2
Florida	8
Georgia	8
Idaho	3
Illinois	11
Indiana	7
Iowa	3
Kansas	3
Kentucky	3
Louisiana	7
Maryland	2
Massachusetts	3
Michigan	15
Minnesota	2
Missouri	6
Montana	2
Nebraska	2
Nevada	2
New Jersey	3
New Mexico	2
New York	18
North Carolina	15
Ohio	10
Oklahoma	1
Oregon	2
Pennsylvania	19
Rhode Island	2
South Carolina	4
South Dakota	1
Tennessee	2
Texas	14
Utah	2
Virginia	6
Washington	2
West Virginia	1
Wisconsin	8
Wyoming	1
Washington, D.C.	2

Chapters by province (Canada)

Province	Total charters
Alberta	1
Ontario	1
Quebec	1

== Alumni associations ==
The fraternity has twenty alumni associations in the United States.

Alumni association	Charter date and range	Location	Status	Ref.
Atlanta		Atlanta, Georgia	Active	
Bay Area		San Francisco, California	Active	
Boston		Boston, Massachusetts	Active	
Charlotte		Charlotte, North Carolina	Active	
Chicago		Chicago, Illinois	Active	
Denver		Denver, Colorado	Active	
Detroit		Detroit, Michigan	Active	
Houston		Houston, Texas	Active	
Inland Empire		Riverside County and San Bernardino County, California	Active	
La Verne		La Verne, California	Active	
New York	1906	New York City, New York	Active	
Orange County		Orange County, California	Active	
Phoenix		Phoenix, Arizona	Active	
Portland		Portland, Oregon	Active	
St Louis		St. Louis, Missouri	Active	
Salt Lake City		Salt Lake City, Utah	Active	
San Diego		San Diego, California	Active	
Silicon Valley		San Jose, California	Active	
Triangle Area		Raleigh and Durham, North Carolina	Active	
Washington, D.C.		Washington, D.C.	Active	
