= University Park, Maryland =

- Town
- Town of University Park
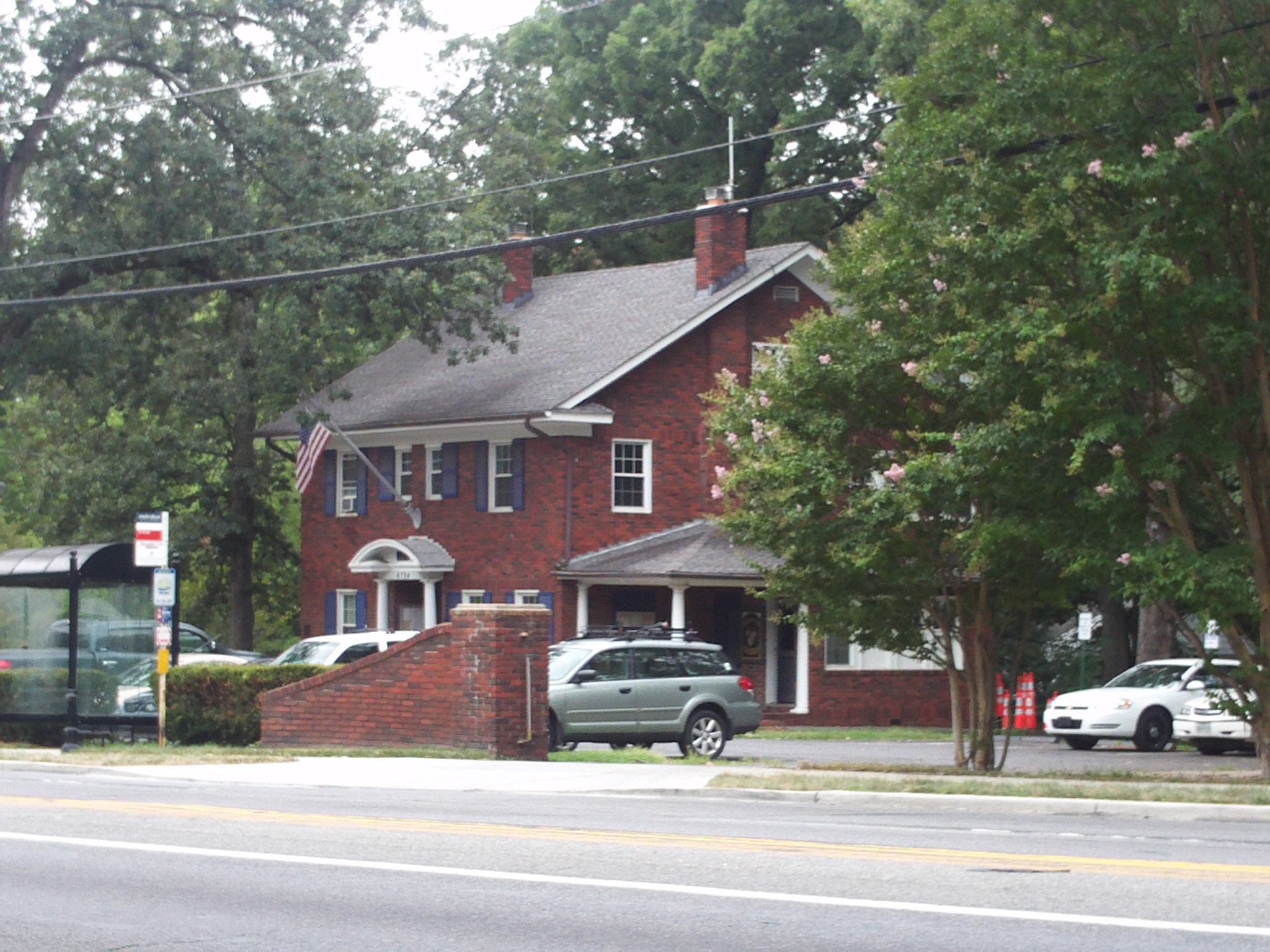
- The University Park Town Hall, in July 2010, at 6724 Baltimore Avenue

- Flag Seal

- Location of University Park, Maryland
- Coordinates: 38°58′17″N 76°56′36″W
- Country: United States of America
- State: Maryland
- County: Prince George's
- Incorporated: 1936

Area
  - Total: 0.50 sq mi (1.30 km^{2})
  - Land: 0.50 sq mi (1.30 km^{2})
  - Water: 0 sq mi (0.00 km^{2})
- Elevation: 72 ft (22 m)

Population (2020)
  - Total: 2,454
  - Density: 4,893.4/sq mi (1,889.34/km^{2})
- Time zone: UTC-5 (Eastern (EST))
  - Summer (DST): UTC-4 (EDT)
- ZIP code: 20782
- Area codes: 301, 240
- FIPS code: 24-79675
- GNIS feature ID: 0598206
- Website: www.upmd.org

University Park is a town in Prince George's County, Maryland, United States. The population was 2,454 at the 2020 census.

== History ==
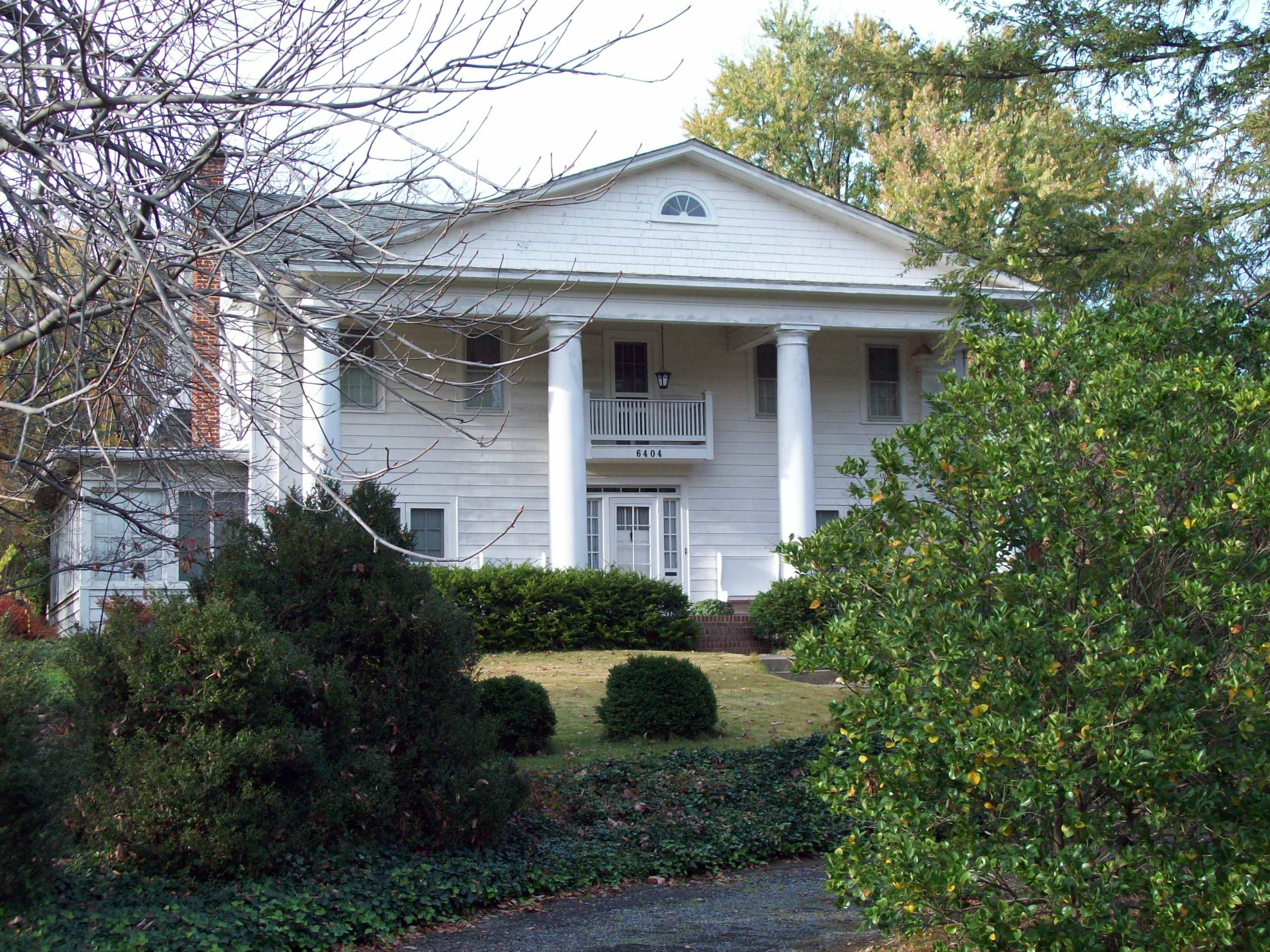
Bloomfield (Deakins House) in November 2008

University Park was developed on land owned by the Deakins family since the mid-1700s. The house known as Deakins Hall or Bloomfield was constructed on the land in the 1820s or 1830s. It is located at 6404 Queens Chapel Road. The farm was purchased by the University Park Company in 1923. The extension of water and sewer lines into area at that time prompted the subdivision of the Deakins tract. The developers promised a community of single-family homes without the intrusion of commercial facilities. Restrictive covenants were placed on the deeds and all house plans had to be approved by the developers. Homebuyers were attracted to University Park due to its high elevation and lush vegetation. The developers also agreed to provide streetlights and trash removal for a 10-year period, and constructed a school in the mid-1920s.

The town was incorporated in 1936, and the current town hall is located at 6724 Baltimore Avenue, on U.S. Route 1.

By 1940, the community had grown to 293 houses. The size of the town nearly doubled between 1940 and 1950, with the construction of another 255 houses. Houses constructed during these periods include brick and wood-frame Bungalow style and revival-style structures. The last building boom occurred in the late 1950s with the construction of 300 brick ranches.

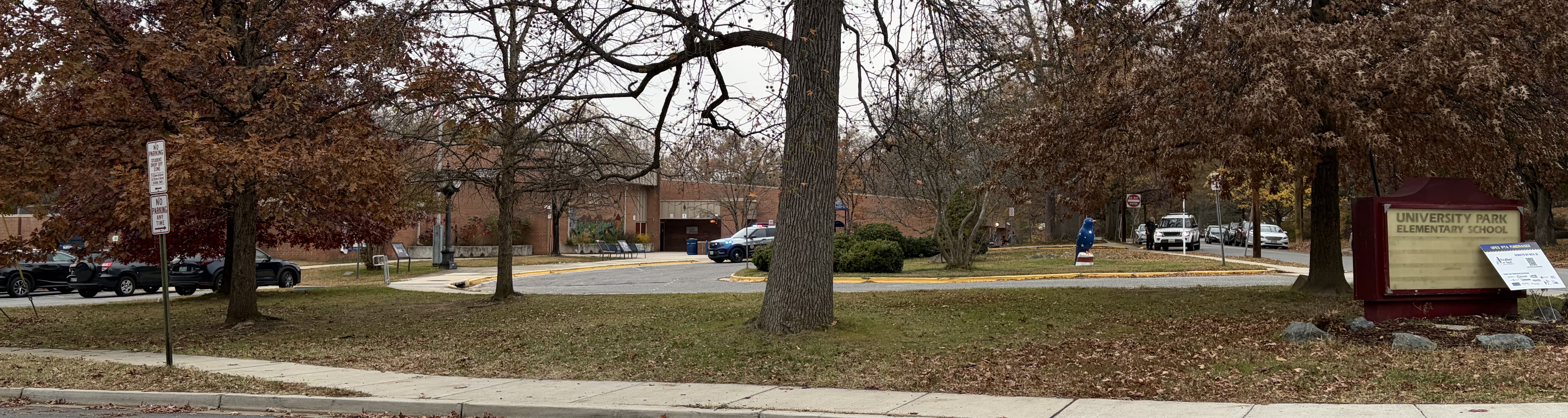
University Park Elementary School

Community facilities include a police department, started in 1965, a school, and a community park. The two-room company school built in the mid-1920s was converted to a residence after the county constructed a new school building in 1928, which was replaced in 1978 with a modern facility. The town park was purchased in 1941, though its development was postponed by World War II. It was designed and developed in the early 1950s to include a sunken garden, trails, playground, tennis courts, and picnic area. The town remains without commercial properties.

The University Park Historic District, a national historic district on the National Register of Historic Places, was listed in 1997. Residents who own homes that are "contributing structures" to the University Park Historic District may participate in the Heritage Preservation Tax Credit Program, administered through the Maryland Historical Trust. Participants in this program receive a tax credit for a portion of the cost of certified work that maintains or rehabilitates the contributing structures. One such structure identified by the Maryland-National Capital Park and Planning Commission is Bloomfield.

=== September 11 attacks ===
University Park lost five of its residents in the September 11 attacks: The Falkenberg/Whittington family – Charles, Zoe, and Dana Falkenberg and Leslie Whittington, died on September 11 aboard American Airlines Flight 77, which crashed into the Pentagon during a flight from Dulles International Airport to Los Angeles International Airport. They were headed to Australia for a two-month stay. Sheila Hein died when Flight 77 crashed into the Pentagon, in which she worked.

== Geography ==
University Park is located at 38°58′17″N 76°56′36″W (38.971381, −76.943399).

According to the United States Census Bureau, the town has a total area of 0.50 square miles (1.29 km^{2}), all land.

University Park is bordered on the north by the city of College Park, to the south and east by the city of Riverdale Park, to the south and west by the city of Hyattsville, and is bordered in several directions by certain unincorporated parts of Prince George's County, such as Adelphi.

The town includes a large public park and a portion of Wells Run, a small tributary of the Northeast Branch of the Anacostia River.

== Government ==
The town was incorporated in 1936 and has expanded several times since then. The town has its own town council, police department, and sanitation services.

The current mayor of University Park is Laurie Morrissey. The Chief of Police is David Coleman, appointed by the mayor with approval of the town council.

University Park is served by several voluntary organizations, including the University Park Civic Association (UPCA), the University Park Women's Club (UPWC), and the Lewisdale-University Park Boys and Girls Club (LUP).

=== Law enforcement ===
Prince George's County Police Department District 1 Station in Hyattsville serves University Park.

In addition to the Prince George's County Police Department, the town is serviced by the University Park Police Department (UPPD). The UPPD was created in 1962 with a single officer acting as chief and patrolman. The UPPD currently has an authorized force of eight certified, sworn officers that provided 24-hour service to a population of over 2,300 within the municipality and adjoining streets and roadways. The UPPD provides vehicular, foot, and bicycle patrol and is aided by the Prince George's County Police and Sheriff's Office for other incidents deemed appropriate by authority.

== Transportation ==
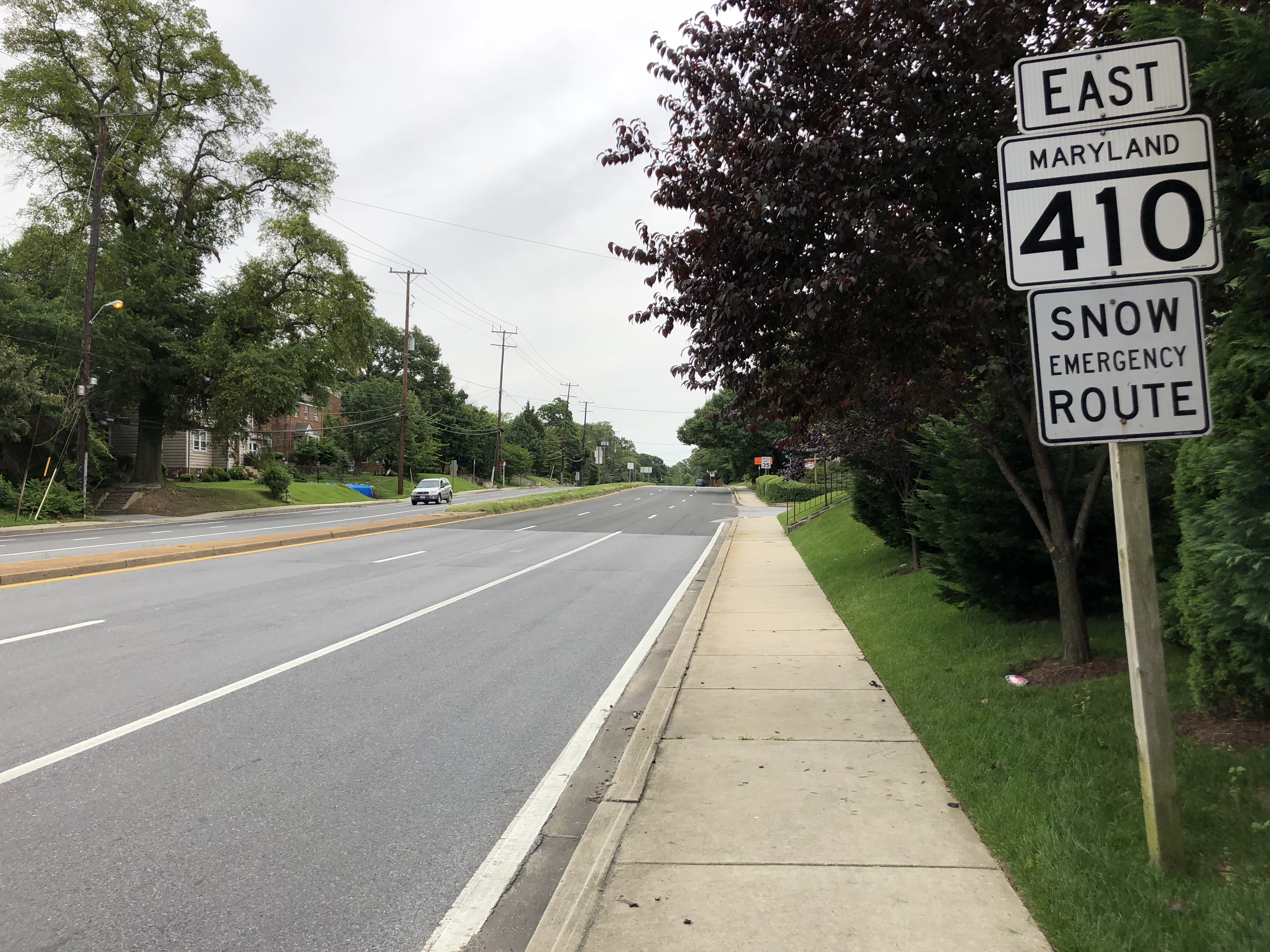
MD 410 eastbound on the south edge of University Park

The only state highway directly serving University Park is Maryland Route 410, the East-West Highway. MD 410 serves as a local connector route linking the inner suburbs on the northern and northeastern sides of Washington, D.C. together. Just outside the town limits, MD 410 has junctions with U.S. Route 1 and Maryland Route 500, both of which connect directly to Washington D.C. US 1 also connects with the nearest interstate highways, Interstate 95 and Interstate 495 (the Capital Beltway).

== Education ==
University Park is served by Prince George's County Public Schools: zoned schools are University Park Elementary School (in University Park), Hyattsville Middle School (in Hyattsville), and Northwestern High School (in Hyattsville).

Many University Park high school students choose to attend Eleanor Roosevelt High School in Greenbelt.

== Demographics ==
Historical population
Census	Pop.	Note	%±
1940	878		—
1950	2,205		151.1%
1960	3,098		40.5%
1970	2,926		−5.6%
1980	2,536		−13.3%
1990	2,243		−11.6%
2000	2,318		3.3%
2010	2,548		9.9%
2020	2,454		−3.7%
U.S. Decennial Census

=== Racial and ethnic composition ===
University Park town, Maryland – Racial and ethnic composition Note: the US Census treats Hispanic/Latino as an ethnic category. This table excludes Latinos from the racial categories and assigns them to a separate category. Hispanics/Latinos may be of any race.
Race / Ethnicity (NH = Non-Hispanic)	Pop 2000	Pop 2010	Pop 2020	% 2000	% 2010	% 2020
White alone (NH)	1,895	1,840	1,605	81.75%	72.21%	65.40%
Black or African American alone (NH)	164	223	248	7.08%	8.75%	10.11%
Native American or Alaska Native alone (NH)	6	0	3	0.26%	0.00%	0.12%
Asian alone (NH)	85	116	151	3.67%	4.55%	6.15%
Native Hawaiian or Pacific Islander alone (NH)	0	0	0	0.00%	0.00%	0.00%
Other race alone (NH)	8	3	13	0.35%	0.12%	0.53%
Mixed race or Multiracial (NH)	31	79	146	1.34%	3.10%	5.95%
Hispanic or Latino (any race)	129	287	288	5.57%	11.26%	11.74%
Total	2,318	2,548	2,454	100.00%	100.00%	100.00%

=== 2020 census ===
As of the 2020 census, there were 2,454 people in University Park. The median age was 42.1 years. 20.2% of residents were under the age of 18 and 20.0% were 65 years of age or older. For every 100 females, there were 97.4 males, and for every 100 females age 18 and over there were 98.9 males.

There were 886 households, of which 33.2% had children under the age of 18 living in them. Of all households, 65.6% were married-couple households, 11.6% were households with a male householder and no spouse or partner present, and 19.6% were households with a female householder and no spouse or partner present. About 17.2% of all households were made up of individuals, and 10.5% had someone living alone who was 65 years of age or older. There were 928 housing units, of which 4.5% were vacant. The homeowner vacancy rate was 0.5% and the rental vacancy rate was 7.1%.

100.0% of residents lived in urban areas, while 0.0% lived in rural areas.

=== 2010 census ===
As of the census of 2010, there were 2,548 people, 897 households, and 675 families residing in the town. The population density was 5,096.0 inhabitants per square mile (1,967.6/km^{2}). There were 919 housing units at an average density of 1,838.0 per square mile (709.7/km^{2}). The racial makeup of the town was 78.5% White, 9.3% African American, 0.1% Native American, 4.7% Asian, 3.0% from other races, and 4.4% from two or more races. Hispanic or Latino of any race were 11.3% of the population.

There were 897 households, of which 35.1% had children under the age of 18 living with them, 62.8% were married couples living together, 9.1% had a female householder with no husband present, 3.3% had a male householder with no wife present, and 24.7% were non-families. 16.3% of all households were made up of individuals, and 6.4% had someone living alone who was 65 years of age or older. The average household size was 2.84 and the average family size was 3.05.

The median age in the town was 41.5 years. 23.1% of residents were under the age of 18; 8.5% were between the ages of 18 and 24; 23.1% were from 25 to 44; 33.4% were from 45 to 64; and 11.8% were 65 years of age or older. The gender makeup of the town was 50.2% male and 49.8% female.

=== 2000 census ===
As of the census of 2000, there were 2,318 people, 877 households, and 637 families residing in the town. The population density was 4,677.5 inhabitants per square mile (1,806.0/km^{2}). There were 898 housing units at an average density of 1,812.1 per square mile (699.7/km^{2}). The racial makeup of the town was 85.46% White, 7.29% African American, 0.26% Native American, 3.67% Asian, 1.04% from other races, and 2.29% from two or more races. Hispanic or Latino of any race were 5.57% of the population.

There were 877 households, out of which 33.9% had children under the age of 18 living with them, 61.6% were married couples living together, 8.1% had a female householder with no husband present, and 27.3% were non-families. 20.1% of all households were made up of individuals, and 9.6% had someone living alone who was 65 years of age or older. The average household size was 2.63 and the average family size was 2.99.

In the town, the population was spread out, with 23.9% under the age of 18, 5.7% from 18 to 24, 26.8% from 25 to 44, 28.3% from 45 to 64, and 15.3% who were 65 years of age or older. The median age was 42 years. For every 100 females, there were 96.3 males. For every 100 females age 18 and over, there were 91.8 males.

The median income for a household in the town was $89,450, and the median income for a family was $96,349. Males had a median income of $62,375 versus $43,083 for females. The per capita income for the town was $40,402. About 1.2% of families and 3.5% of the population were below the poverty line, including 2.9% of those under age 18 and 1.4% of those age 65 or over.

== Notable people ==
- James M. Cain, author, The Postman Always Rings Twice, Double Indemnity, Mildred Pierce
- Bill Cobey, former U.S. representative from North Carolina's 4th congressional district and the director of the Jesse Helms Center in Wingate, North Carolina, was reared in University Park, where his father was athletic director of the University of Maryland.
- Parris Glendening, governor of Maryland from 1995 to 2003, called University Park his hometown.
- Jim Henson, creator of The Muppets later used on Sesame Street, grew up in University Park.
- Paul G. Pinsky, former Maryland State Senator (22nd District) currently resides in University Park.
- Morgan Wootten coached at DeMatha Catholic High School in Hyattsville from 1956 to 2002.

== See also ==
- College Heights Estates Historic District
