= Jesse Helms Center =

American museum

Coordinates: 35°58′34″N 80°26′01″W

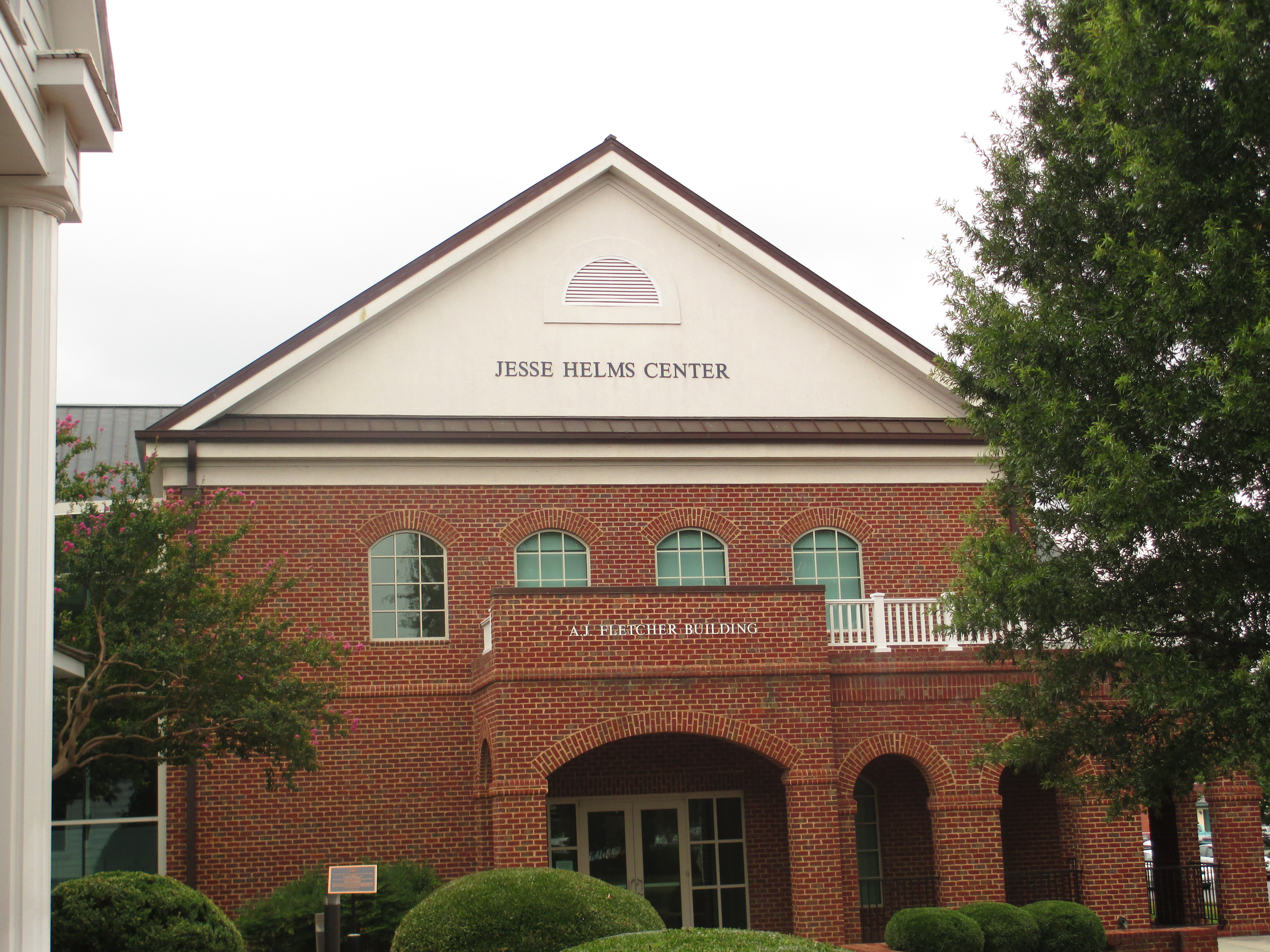
- The Helms Center
- Established: 1994; current building 2001
- Location: Wingate, North Carolina
- Director: Bill Cobey
- Website: www.jessehelmscenter.org

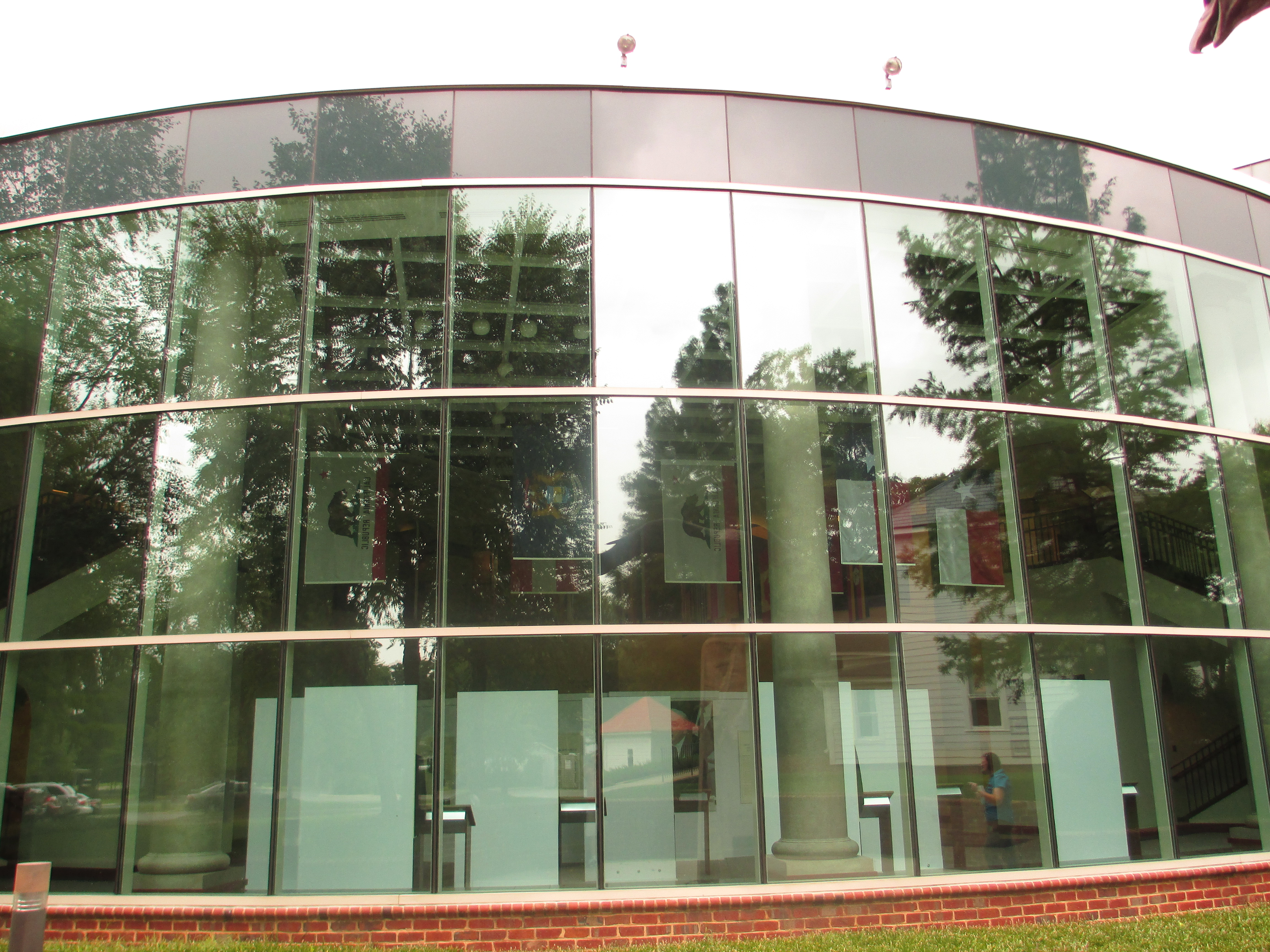
The Helms Center is built of brick and, at the entrance, circular plate class.

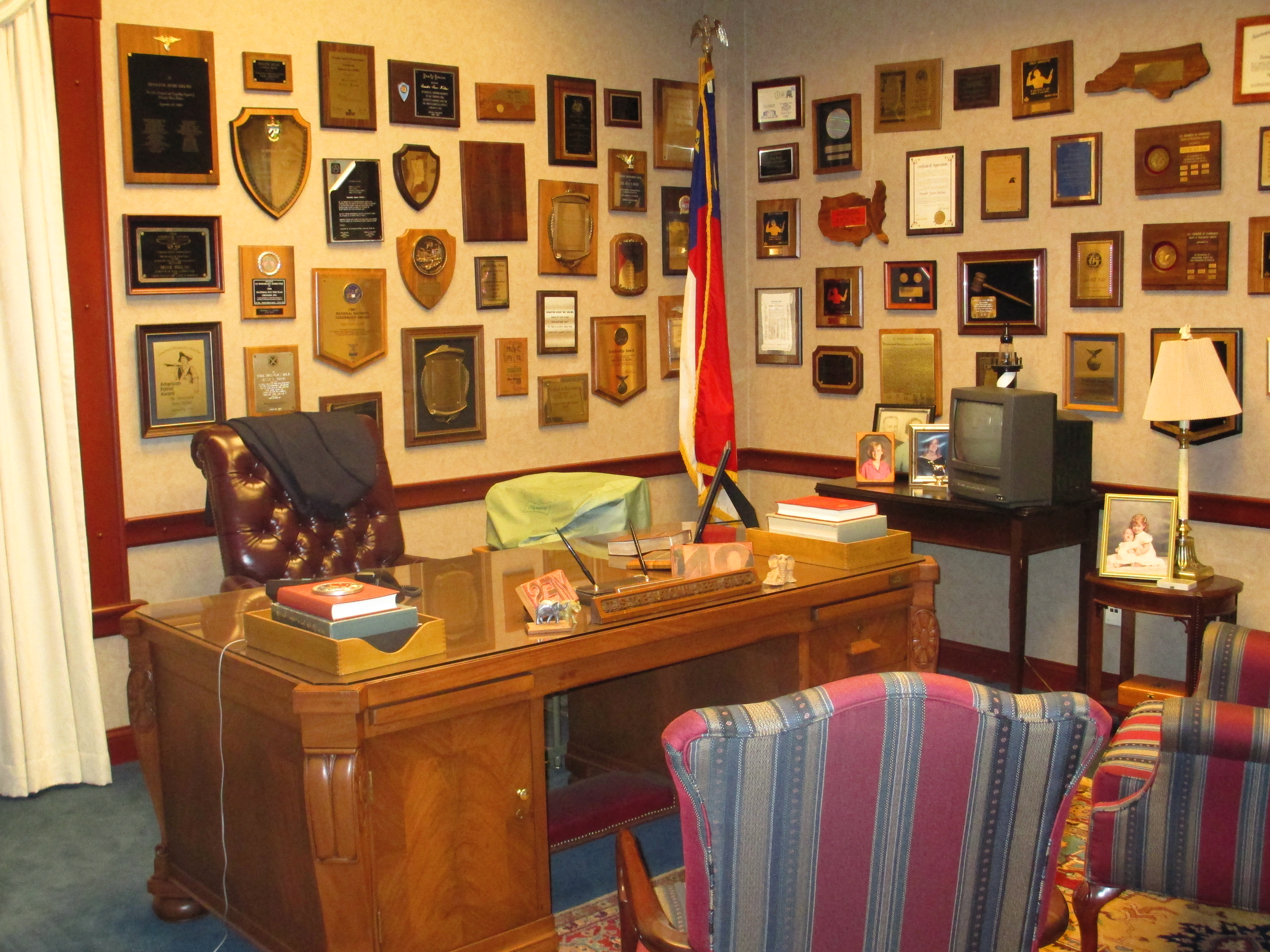
The restoration of Helms' U.S. Senate office

The Jesse Helms Center, located in Wingate, North Carolina and named for its founder, U.S. Senator Jesse Helms, is a repository of Helms' papers, letters, speeches, transcripts of his televised editorials for WRAL-TV, books of faith, and a replica of his Senate desk and office. There are also campaign materials, such as polling information, walled editorial cartoons, and advertisements.

Since 1995, the President of the Jesse Helms Center has been John Dodd. The organization is governed by a board of directors.

The Helms Center was established in 1994, after Helms rejected requests that his papers be left to an Ivy League university. He instead deposited the material with his home-county Wingate University, a private institution which he had once attended. In 2001, the center opened as a 3.3 million, two-story brick and glass structure situated next to the Wingate Town Hall.

The Helms Center hosts a center-sponsored lecture series with such notable participants as former British Prime Minister Margaret Thatcher, former United States Secretary of State Condoleezza Rice, and the Dalai Lama of Tibet.

The center sponsors the annual Helms Foreign Relations School, which consists of two days of classes held near Washington, D.C. Helms and Nathaniel Macon, who is honored with an exhibit at the Helms Center, are the only North Carolina senators ever to chair the Senate Foreign Relations Committee.
