= Porter Byrum =

- Born: July 23, 1920; Forsyth County, North Carolina, U.S.
- Died: March 27, 2017 (aged 96); Charlotte, North Carolina, U.S.
- Resting place: Ballards Bridge Baptist Church Cemetery, Tyner, North Carolina, U.S.

Porter Brown Byrum (July 23, 1920 – March 27, 2017) was an American attorney, businessman and philanthropist. The welcome center at his alma mater Wake Forest University is now named for him, as is the Wingate University School of Business.

== Early life ==
Byrum was born in Forsyth County, North Carolina, in 1920 to John Thomas Byrum, a Southern Baptist minister, and Isa Ward. He was their fifth and final child, each of them sons.

In 1942, a year after his mother's death, he graduated with Juris Doctor from Wake Forest University School of Law, which was then in Wake Forest, North Carolina. Upon graduating, during World War II, he was deployed to Europe, where he served as a captain in the United States Army under General George Patton in the Battle of the Bulge. He also helped liberate Buchenwald concentration camp.

== Career ==
In 1967, Byrum bought Park Road Shopping Center in Charlotte, North Carolina. On June 16, 2011, he announced that the shopping center would be donated to three local colleges: Queens University of Charlotte, Wingate University and Wake Forest University. Byrum had held ownership of the shopping center for nearly 44 years. Just one month later, the three colleges sold the shopping center, for $82 million, to Edens & Avant, a shopping center operator and developer.

After the war, he settled in Charlotte, and began a sixty-year career practicing law. He decided not to charge hourly fees, instead billing according to the help offered. He also had a fifty-year association with Charlotte Aircraft Corporation, and was vice-president and of legal counsel to Allied Life Insurance Company.

== Personal life ==
Byrum donated over $120 million to Wake Forest University, all as scholarships. In 1993, he established the John Thomas Byrum Law Scholarship in memory of his father, who died in 1961. In 2001, he established the Porter B. Byrum Athletic Scholarship, followed five years later by the Porter B. Byrum Scholarship for undergraduate students. He received its Law School's highest honor, the Carroll Weathers Award, in 2006.

In 2011, the Wake Forest University Welcome Center, nicknamed the "front porch" was named for Byrum. His portrait hangs in its lobby.

Wingate University's School of Business, established in 2011, is also named for Byrum.

In 1994, he leased 250 acres (100 ha) of land near Huntersville, North Carolina, for the inaugural Carolina Renaissance Festival.

== Death ==
Byrum died in 2017, aged 96. He was interred in Ballards Bridge Baptist Church Cemetery in Tyner, North Carolina, alongside his parents and stepmother, Helen, who died in 1982.
