= University Park Historic District (University Park, Maryland) =

Historic district in Maryland, United States

- U.S. National Register of Historic Places
- U.S. Historic district
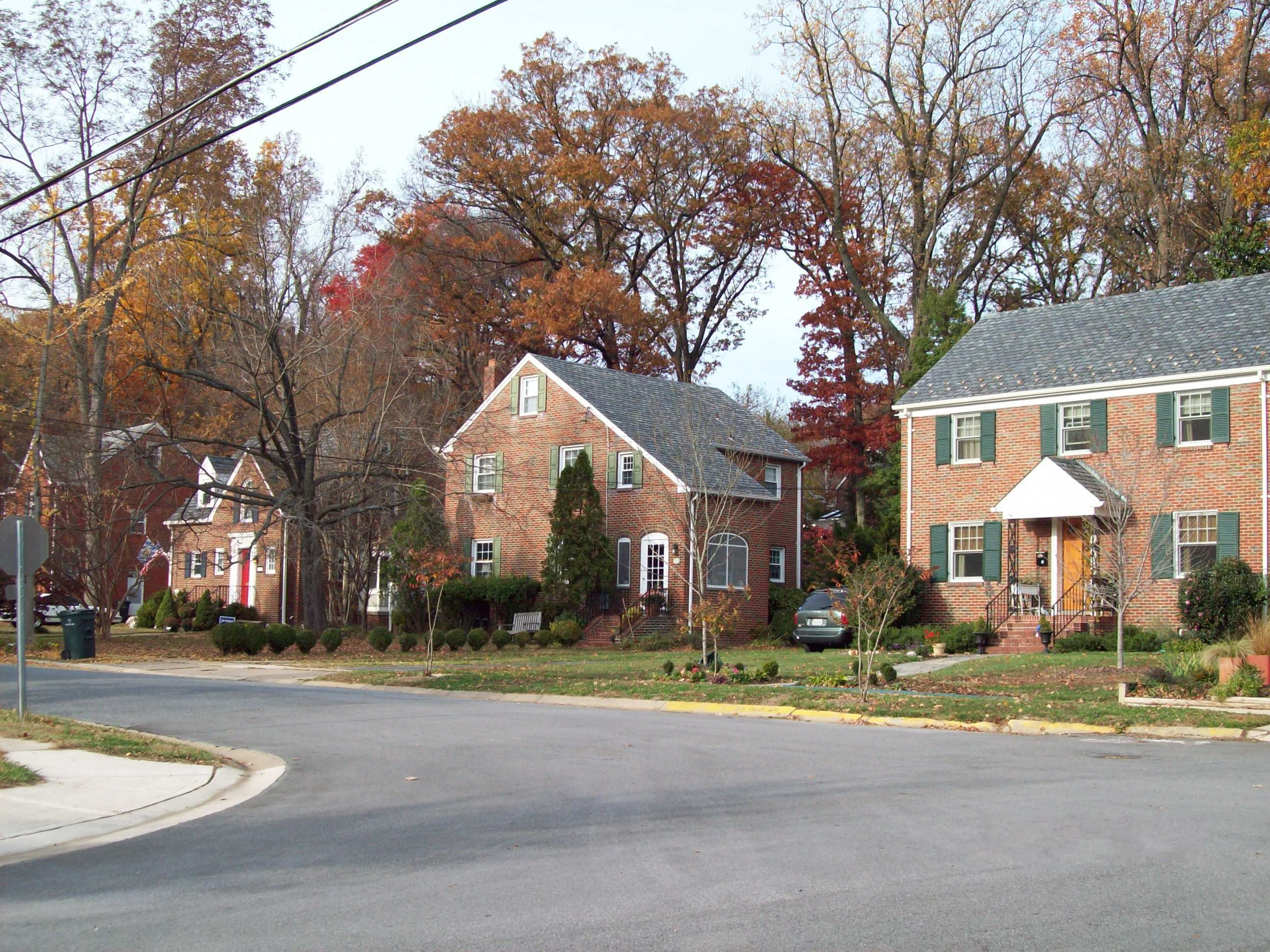
- A typical street in University Park November 2008

- Location within Maryland Location within the United States
- Location: Bounded by Baltimore Ave., MD 410, and Adelphi Rd., University Park, Maryland
- Coordinates: 38°58′12″N 76°56′38″W
- Area: 306 acres (124 ha)
- Architect: Groff, Forrest U.; Moffatt, H.J., et al.
- Architectural style: Mission/Spanish Revival, Tudor Revival, Colonial Revival
- MPS: Historic Residential Suburbs in the United States, 1830-1960
- NRHP reference No.: 96001084, 12001025 (Boundary Increase)
- Added to NRHP: October 10, 1996, December 12, 2012 (Boundary Increase)

The University Park Historic District is a national historic district located in the town of University Park, Prince George's County, Maryland. The district encompasses 1,149 contributing buildings and 2 contributing sites and is almost exclusively residential and developed as a middle-class, automobile suburb of Washington, D.C. The primary building type is the detached single-family dwelling, with the only non-residential buildings within the district and the town being two churches and the Town Hall, which is located in a former residence. Notable features within the district include the property's original plantation house, known as Bloomfield (Deakins House), and the nearby family cemetery. It was developed over the period 1920 to 1945, and houses are built in a range of popular early-20th-century architectural styles including Tudor and Mediterranean Revival, and varied interpretations of the Craftsman Aesthetic and the Colonial Revival, including interpretations of Dutch, Georgian, and Federal period substyles.

It was listed on the National Register of Historic Places in 1996, with a boundary increase in 2012.

== Gallery ==
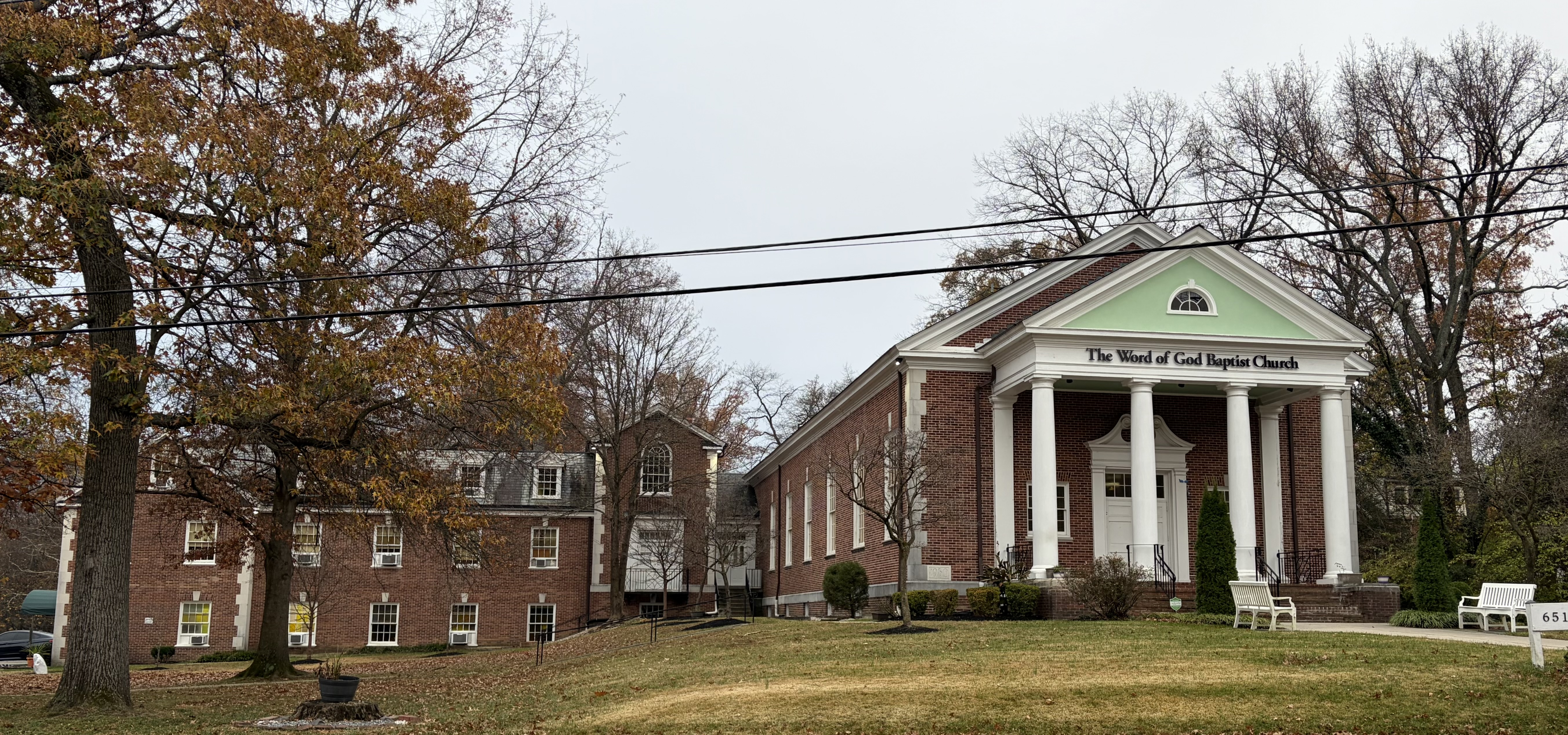
Word of God Baptist Church (formerly Riverdale Presbyterian) in November 2025

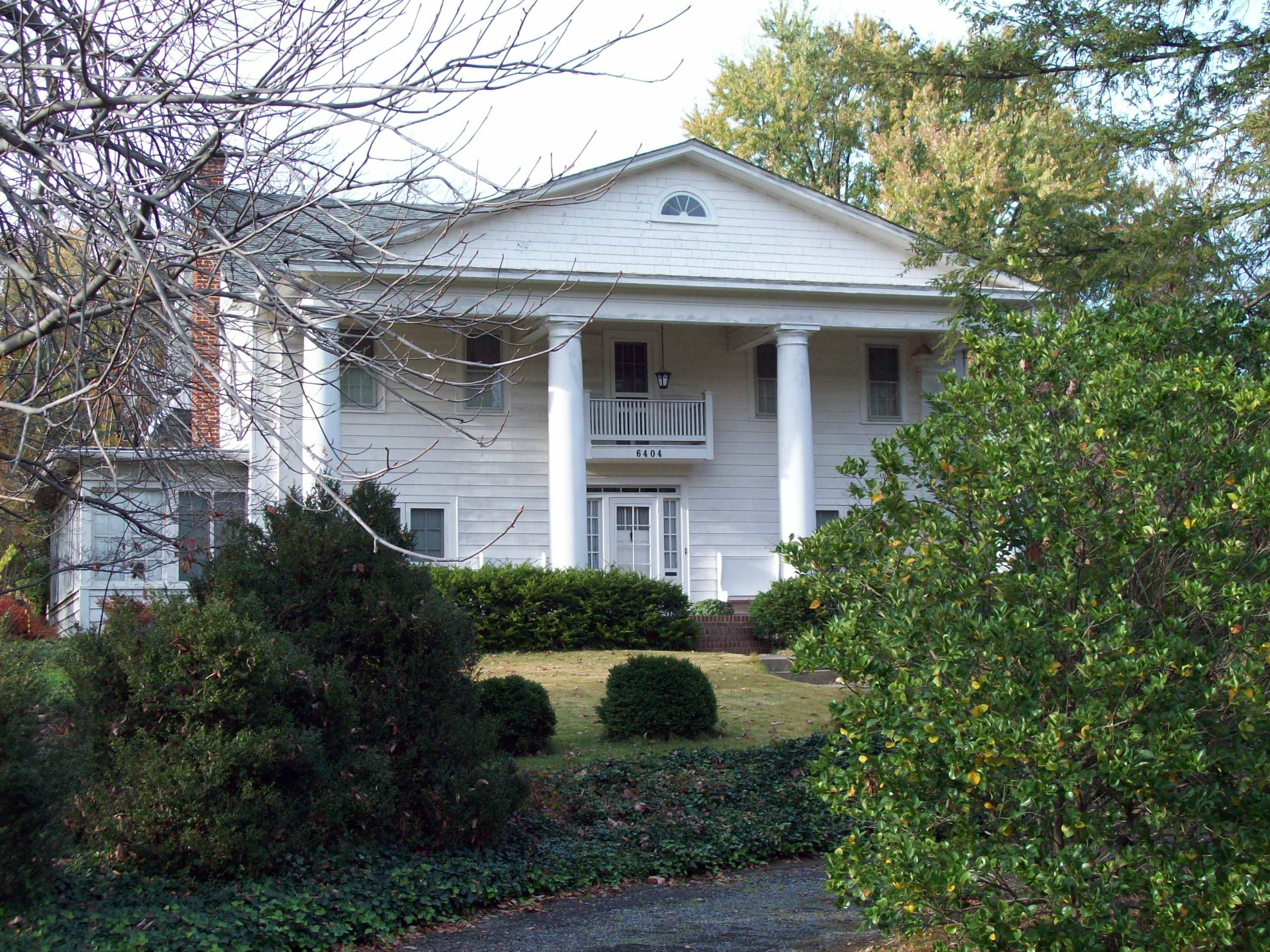
Bloomfield (Deakins House) in November 2008
