= Wingate Commercial Historic District =

Historic district in North Carolina, United States

- U.S. National Register of Historic Places
- U.S. Historic district
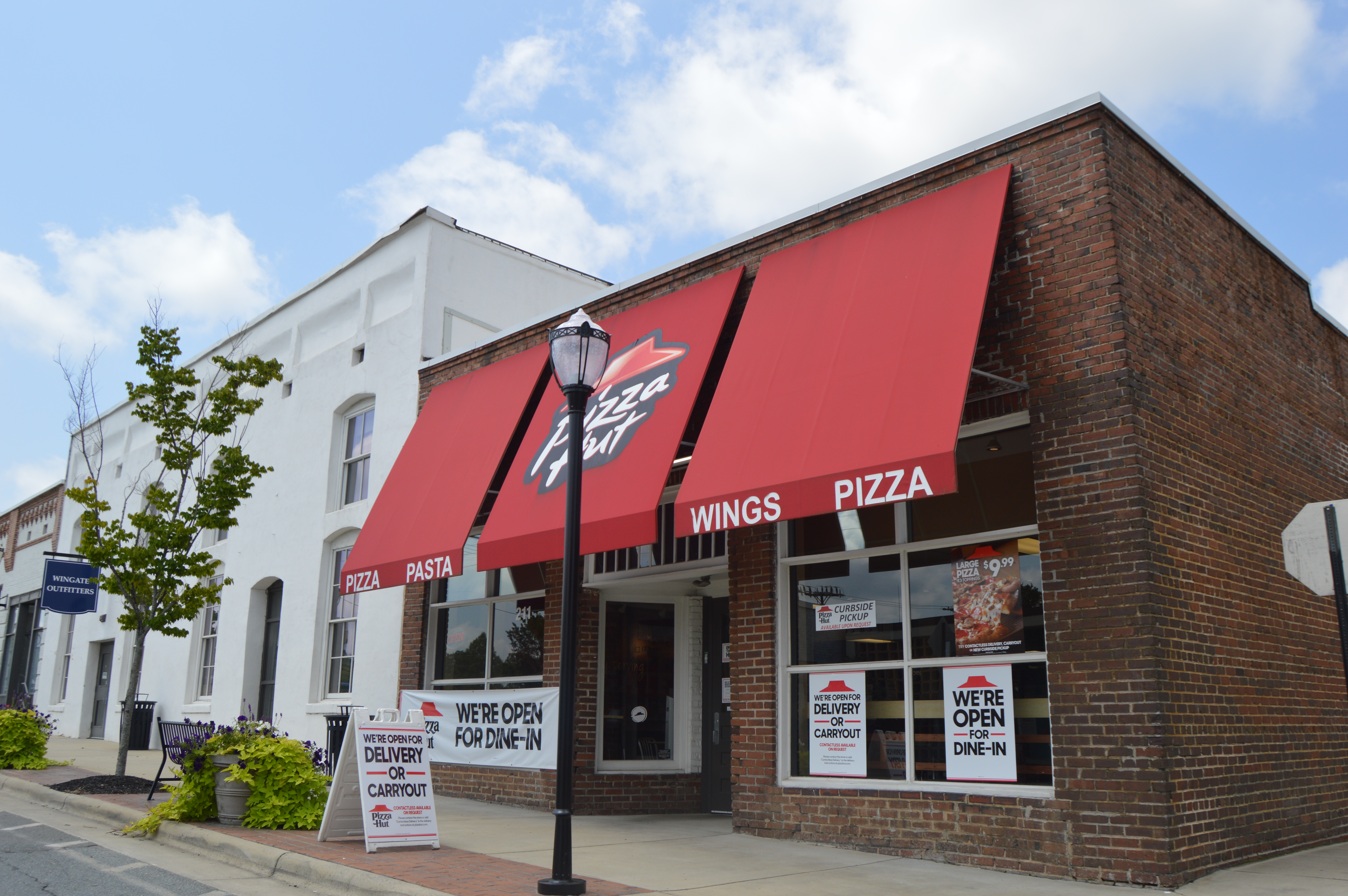
- Northern end of the district

- Location within North Carolina Location within the United States
- Location: 203, 205, 207-209, 211 Main St., Wingate, North Carolina
- Coordinates: 34°59′03″N 80°26′56″W
- Area: 71.5 acres (28.9 ha)
- Built: 1888
- Architect: Multiple
- Architectural style: Bungalow/craftsman, Queen Anne, Commercial Style
- NRHP reference No.: 14000992
- Added to NRHP: December 1, 2014

The Wingate Commercial Historic District is a national historic district located at Wingate, Union County, North Carolina. It encompasses four contributing buildings in the central business district of Wingate. The district developed between about 1904 and 1925 and the one-story, brick commercial buildings are the State Bank of Wingate (c. 1909), Wingate Drug Company Store (c. 1910), J. L. Austin Company Store (c. 1904), and Katie Lee Austin Store (1925).

It was listed on the National Register of Historic Places in 2014.
