= College Heights Estates Historic District =

Historic district in Maryland, United States

- U.S. National Register of Historic Places
- U.S. Historic district
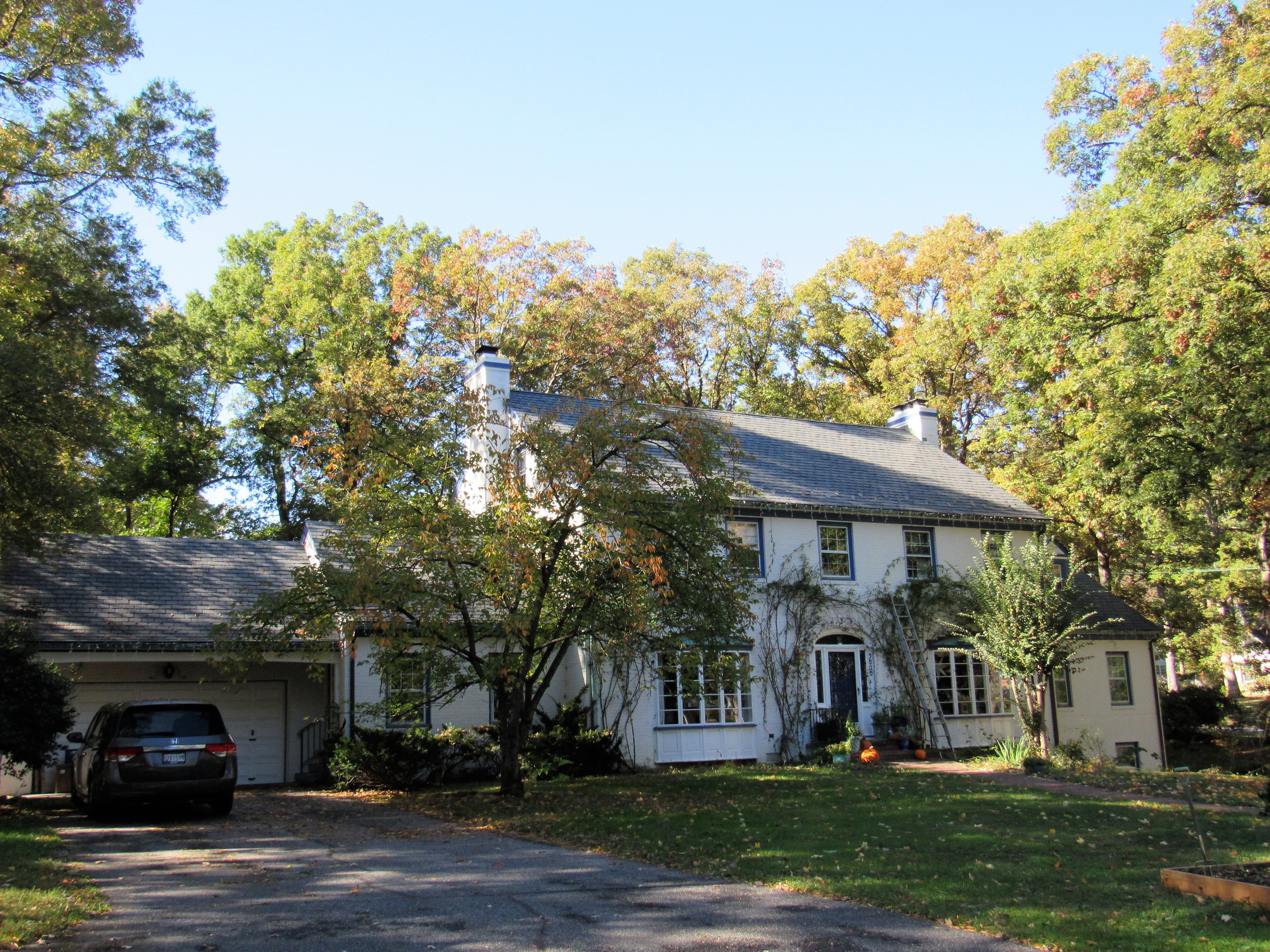
- House on Calverton Drive

- Location within Maryland Location within the United States
- Location: Roughly bounded by Adelphi Rd., U. of Maryland College Park, University Park, Van Buren St., Wells Pkwy., University Park, Maryland
- Coordinates: 38°58′38″N 76°57′02″W
- Area: 120 acres (49 ha)
- Built: 1938
- Architectural style: Colonial Revival, Tudor Revival, Contemporary
- MPS: Historic Residential Suburbs in the United States, 1830-1960
- NRHP reference No.: 12001023
- Added to NRHP: December 12, 2012

The College Heights Estates Historic District encompasses 170 contributing buildings in a mid-20th century automobile-centered residential suburban area of University Park, Maryland, and the neighboring unincorporated area of College Heights Estates in Prince George's County. The earliest portions of the area were platted out in 1938, and the area was mostly built out between then and 1960. The area features winding lanes and dead-end roads, with large houses on generously sized lots. Houses built before the Second World War are predominantly Colonial Revival in character, while post-war construction includes a large number of ranch, split-entry, and Cape style houses, although they are generally larger than other similar houses built in other neighborhoods. Also distinguishing the neighborhood from others are a significant number of architect-designed homes.

The district was listed on the National Register of Historic Places in 2012.

== See also ==
- National Register of Historic Places listings in Prince George's County, Maryland
