= Tyner, North Carolina =

- Unincorporated community
- Location of Tyner in North Carolina Tyner (the United States)
- Coordinates: 36°12′55″N 76°36′39″W
- Country: United States
- State: North Carolina
- County: Chowan
- Elevation: 46 ft (14 m)

Population (2000)
  - Total: 249
- Time zone: UTC-5 (Eastern (EST))
  - Summer (DST): UTC-4 (EDT)
- ZIP code: 27980
- Area code: 252
- FIPS code: 37-37041
- GNIS feature ID: 1019593
- Other names: Center Hill; Centre Hill

Tyner, also called Center Hill, is an unincorporated community in Chowan County, North Carolina, United States, located approximately 20 miles (32 km) from Elizabeth City and about 70 miles (110 km) from Virginia Beach, Virginia.

== Notable people ==
- Porter Byrum, attorney and philanthropist
