= Washington Manly Wingate =

4th president of Wake Forest College (b. 1828, d. 1879)

Washington Manly Wingate (1828–1879) served as the fourth president of Wake Forest College, from 1853 to 1862, and then after the Civil War from 1866 until his death in 1879. He is also the namesake for Wingate University, located in Wingate, North Carolina.

== Early life ==
W. M. Wingate was born July 28, 1828, in Darlington, South Carolina, to William and Isabella Blackwell Wingate. Wingate graduated from Wake Forest College in 1849, then studied at the Furman Theological Institute, now Furman University, for two additional years. He married Mary E. Webb in December 1850. Together, the pair had seven children: Alice, Lizzie, Walter Blackwell, William Jonathan, Belle, Sally, and Ruth. Wingate became and ordained Baptist minister on March 3, 1852.

== Career ==
Wingate was hired as a professor of moral and intellectual philosophy and rhetoric and president pro tempore in June 1853. Under his leadership, Wingate strengthened Baptist influence in the institution, both through preaching and community ties. In return, Wake Forest College received large donations from Baptist organizations, helping sustain the college through the Civil War, and helped it grow thereafter. When Wake Forest closed during the Civil War, from May 1862 to January 1866, Wingate preached for soldiers, edited for the Baptist State Convention newspaper, Biblical Recorder, and published a tract called I Have Brought My Little Brother Back.

In June 1852, Wake Forest College submitted a report stating "is the expedient and proper as well as necessary for the success of this Institution, that the sum of Fifty Thousand Dollars be raised as speedily as possible for the endowment of Wake Forest College". Through canvassing, preaching and articles in the Biblical Recorder, Wingate was able to raise the endowment in five years.

== Death and legacy ==
He died from heart complications on February 27, 1879.

During his lifetime, Wingate received honorary D.D. diplomas from Columbian College (currently known as George Washington University) and University of North Carolina-Chapel Hill in 1865 and 1871, respectively. After the Wake Forest campus moved from Wake Forest, North Carolina, to Winston-Salem in 1953, the Department for the Study of Religions, Chapel and Baptist offices were relocated in a building named in Wingate's honor. In 2021, Wake Forest University proposed renaming Wingate Hall to "May 7, 1860 Hall," the date the institution sold at auction 16 human beings that a slave-owning benefactor bequeathed to Wake Forest through his estate, during Wingate's presidency. Wingate also owned enslaved people. By renaming this building, the university acknowledged its participation in slavery and recognized this aspect of its history and remembers those who labored at the institution against their will. After backlash to the new name, the building was subsequently renamed the Divinity and Religious Studies Building, and the university reorganized the guiding principle for their Advisory Committee on Naming soon after.

The Wake Forest School of Divinity was founded later in 1999. Due to his influence through Wake Forest and the Baptist community, in 1896 Wingate University, and later its home, Wingate, North Carolina, were also named after W.M. Wingate.
