= Wingate University =

Private university in Wingate, North Carolina, U.S.

- Former names: The Wingate School (1896–1923); Wingate Junior College (1923–1977); Wingate College (1977–1995)
- Motto: Faith, Knowledge, Service
- Type: Private university
- Established: 1896; 130 years ago
- Endowment: $138 million
- President: Rhett Brown
- Provost: Laura Hunt
- Faculty: 177
- Students: 3,457
- Undergraduates: 2,673
- Postgraduates: 784
- Location: Wingate, North Carolina, U.S. 34°59′10″N 80°26′39″W
- Colors: (Blue, gold)
- Nickname: Bulldogs
- Sporting affiliations: NCAA Division II
- Mascot: Victor E. Bulldog
- Website: wingate.edu
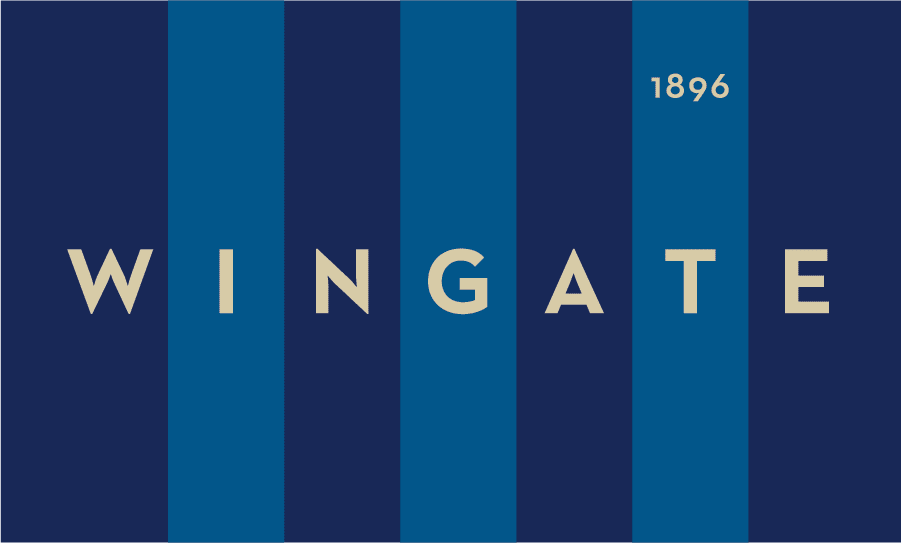

Wingate University is a private university with campuses in Wingate and Hendersonville, North Carolina, United States. The university enrolls more than 3,450 students and offers 37 undergraduate majors as well as 7 master's and 5 doctoral degrees. Academic programs are housed in the Cannon College of Arts and Sciences; the Levine College of Health Sciences; the Byrum School of Business; and the College of Professional Studies, which includes the Thayer School of Education and the School of Sport Sciences.

The university was originally affiliated with the Baptist State Convention of North Carolina. Although it is no longer affiliated with the Baptist convention, the university's materials identify it as promoting "Judeo-Christian principles" and there is no faith requirement for admission to, or employment at, the university.

== History ==
In 1896, Wingate University began as The Wingate School, a primary and secondary institution founded by the Baptist Associations of Union County, North Carolina, and Chesterfield County, South Carolina, in response to a dearth of locally available public schools.

The school took its name from Washington Manly Wingate, a former president of Wake Forest College. Following a 2021 decision by Wake Forest University to rename Wingate Hall, Wingate University publicly acknowledged Washington Wingate's history as a slaveowner and announced they would begin looking for ways to address his past.

The Wingate School initially offered a primary and secondary education and continued to do so until the proliferation of public schools in the early 20th century. In 1923, the school began offering the first two years of a baccalaureate education and became Wingate Junior College. The years leading to World War II were difficult for the institution. Though it began receiving financial support from The Baptist State Convention of North Carolina soon after becoming a college, this support was withdrawn during The Great Depression. It was also during this period, in 1932, that the college's administration building was destroyed by fire. The college survived, however, as a result of the work of its administration, faculty, and supporters as well as the post-World War II college enrollment boom. The Baptist State Convention resumed financial support in 1949, and Charles Cannon, a local businessman and philanthropist, began making substantial donations to the college beginning in the 1950s.

In 1952, Wingate Junior College was accredited by the Southern Association of Colleges and Schools, and in 1977, became a four-year institution, Wingate College. The college continued to grow, especially under the leadership of Jerry McGee, added graduate programs, and became Wingate University in 1995. Wingate also has a campus in Hendersonville, NC, home to graduate programs in pharmacy and physician assistant studies.

From its founding, the institution was affiliated with the Baptist State Convention of North Carolina of the Southern Baptist Convention. In 2007, the university began the process of separating from the convention to allow the university's board of trustees to elect its own members. Wingate was among four universities making identical proposals to the convention. The state convention also agreed to start transferring funds traditionally given directly to the universities into a new scholarship fund for Baptist students.

In 2009, the schools gained autonomy from the Baptist State Convention of North Carolina and established a “good faith and cooperative” relationship with it. The four other schools were, Mars Hill University, Campbell University, Gardner-Webb University, and Chowan University.

Presidents of Wingate University
President	Years
Charles Beach	1923-1924
Joseph Huff	1924-1930
Coy Muckle	1930-1936
J.B. Little	1936-1937
C.C. Burris	1937-1953
Budd Smith	1953-1974
Thomas Corts	1974-1983
Paul Corts	1983-1991
Jerry McGee	1992-2015
Rhett Brown	2015-present

== Academics ==
Wingate offers 37 undergraduate majors, 10 pre-professional programs, and 42 minors. The university offers five bachelor's degrees: Bachelor of Arts, Bachelor of Science, Bachelor of Science in Nursing, Bachelor of Music Education, and Bachelor of Liberal Studies. The university also offers several graduate programs. One-in-five Wingate undergraduate students is preparing to be a pharmacist, physician assistant, physical therapist, occupational therapist, or nurse, and 65 percent of graduate students are enrolled in health sciences.

=== Pharmacy ===
The Wingate University School of Pharmacy is a pharmacy school located in Wingate, North Carolina. The school, part of Wingate University, offers a Doctor of Pharmacy degree and is accredited by the Accreditation Council for Pharmacy Education. As of 2024, tied with 11 other programs, it was ranked #99 among pharmacy colleges in the US.

=== Physician Assistant ===
The physician assistant program is offered at both Wingate, North Carolina and Hendersonville, North Carolina campuses. As of 2021, it was ranked #118 among physician assistant programs within the U.S.

=== Study abroad ===
Started in 1978, the university's W'International program allows eligible juniors to take a two-credit-hour seminar, which ends with a 10-day travel experience for $1,500 or less. Wingate also offers language-immersion summer programs in Costa Rica and Quebec.

== Athletics ==
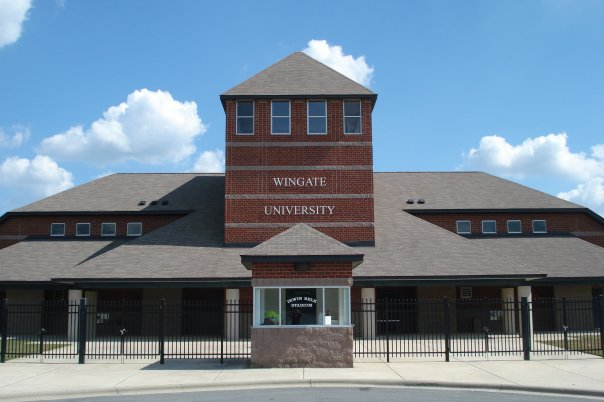
Football stadium of Wingate University

Wingate student-athletes compete in 22 NCAA Division II sports. These sports include: baseball, softball, men's and women's basketball, women's beach volleyball, men's and women's cross country, men's and women's golf, men's and women's soccer, men's and women's swimming and diving, men's and women's tennis, men's and women's track & field, women's triathlon, men's and women's lacrosse, football and volleyball. Wingate's mascot is the Bulldog.

In 2016, the men's soccer team won the school's first team national championship, by defeating University of Charleston 2–0 in the national title game in Kansas City, Missouri.

In 2021, the men's baseball team defeated Central Missouri 5–3 to capture their first national championship.

In 2023, the men's cross country team won the NCAA Division II national championship.

== Notable alumni ==
- Sean Barnette, professional basketball player
- John Bowman, professional football player
- Kenwin Cummings, professional football player
- Dick Elliott, politician
- Ethan Evans, professional football player
- Ken Goodman, politician
- Anthony Dean Griffey, opera singer
- Todd Grisham, sports announcer
- Rohit Gupta, film director
- Lorinza "Junior" Harrington, professional basketball player
- David Hayes, professional soccer player
- Jesse Helms, politician
- David Jones, professional football player
- Leon Levine, business executive
- Richard Lindsay, politician
- Charlie Machell, professional soccer player
- Mike Martin, college baseball coach
- Alvin Morman, professional baseball player
- Luke Mulholland, professional soccer player
- Mitch Farris, professional baseball player
