= Wingate, North Carolina =

- Town
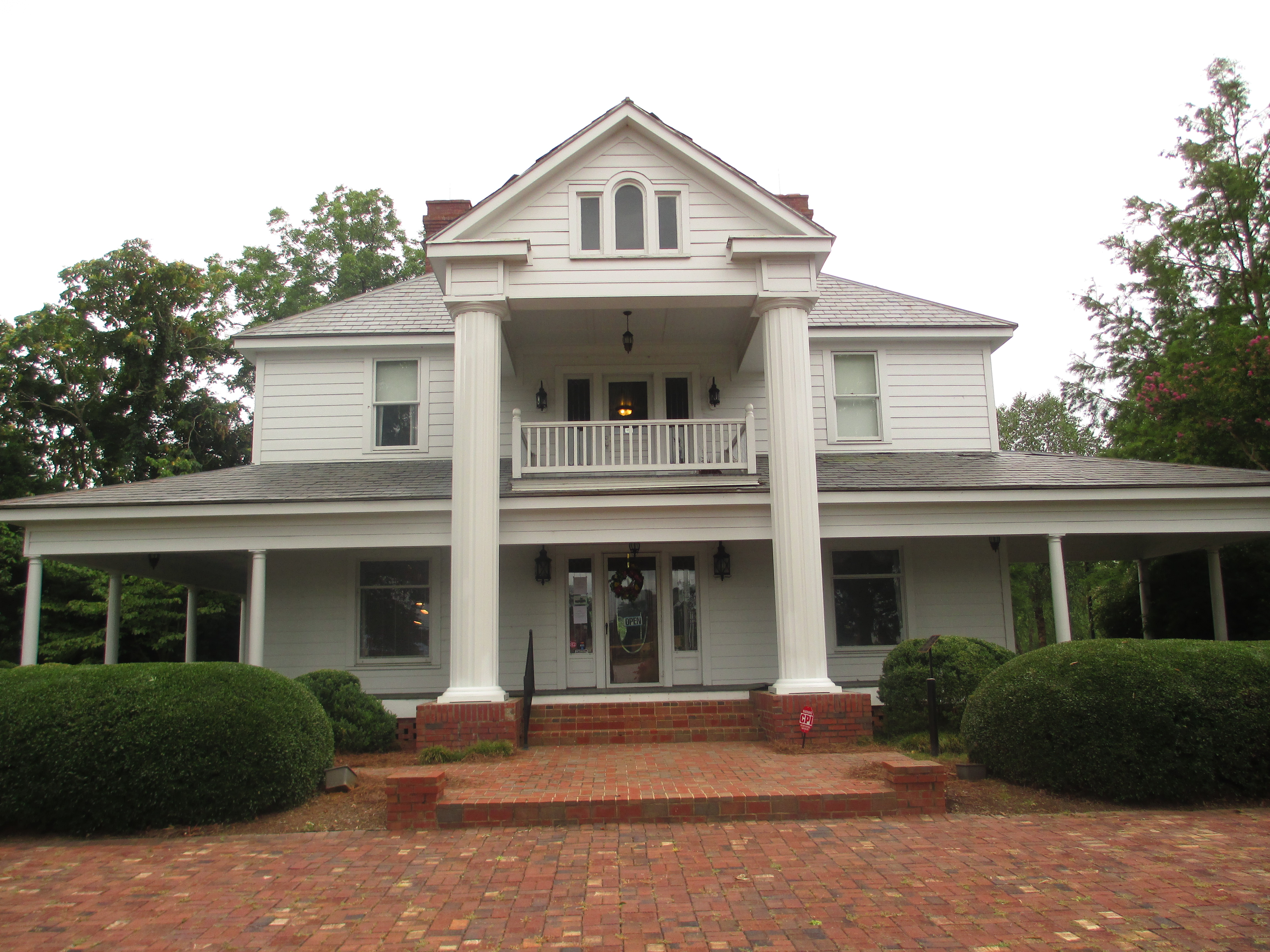
- Wingate Town Hall

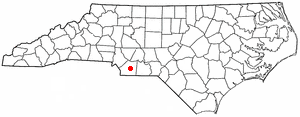
- Location of Wingate, North Carolina
- Coordinates: 34°59′09″N 80°26′53″W
- Country: United States
- State: North Carolina
- County: Union
- Incorporated: 1901
- Named for: Washington M. Wingate

Area
  - Total: 2.25 sq mi (5.83 km^{2})
  - Land: 2.23 sq mi (5.78 km^{2})
  - Water: 0.019 sq mi (0.05 km^{2})
- Elevation: 581 ft (177 m)

Population (2020)
  - Total: 4,055
  - Density: 1,817.2/sq mi (701.61/km^{2})
- Time zone: UTC-5 (Eastern (EST))
  - Summer (DST): UTC-4 (EDT)
- ZIP code: 28174
- Area code: 704
- FIPS code: 37-74760
- GNIS feature ID: 2406902
- Website: www.townofwingatenc.gov

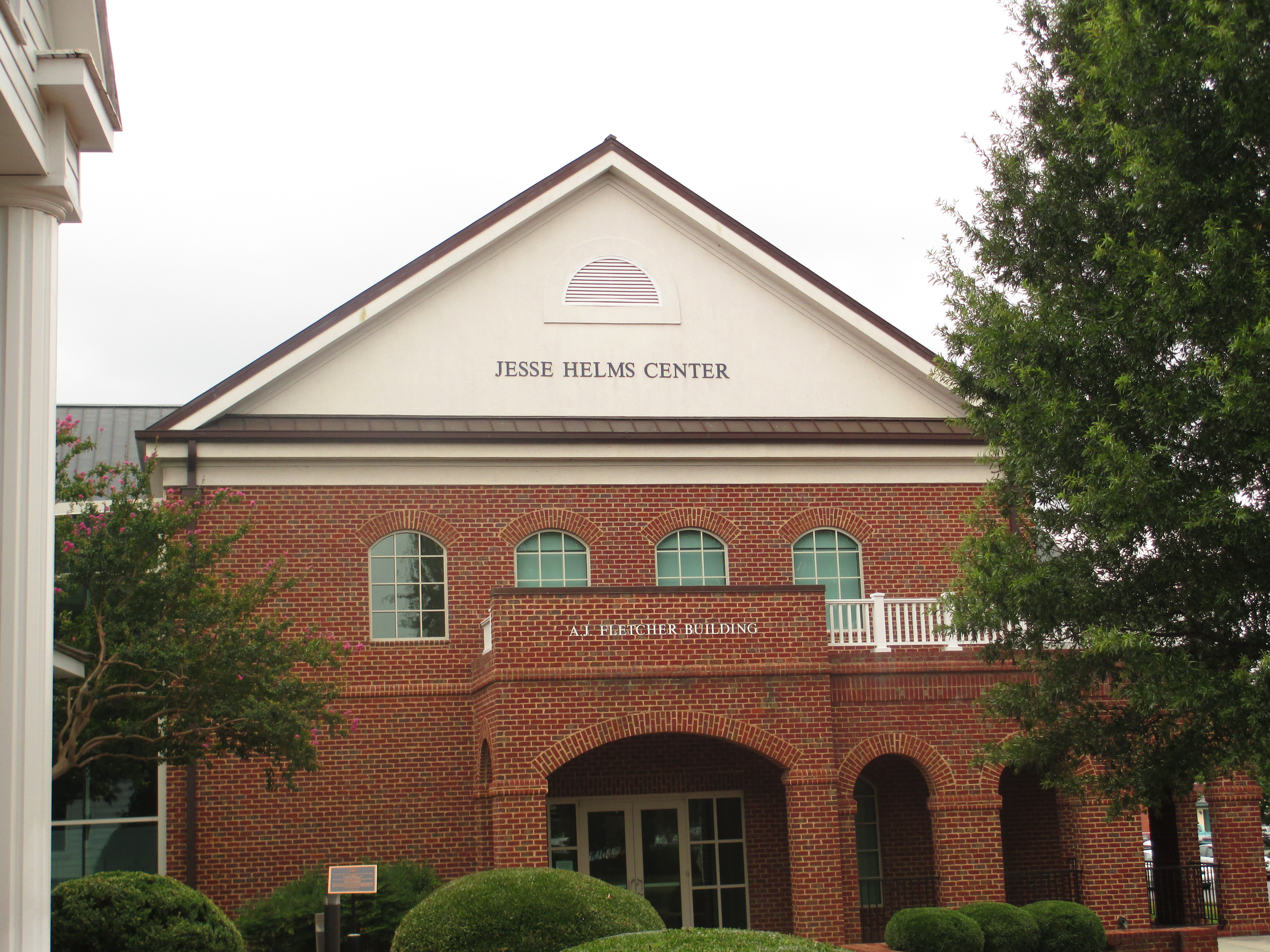
The Jesse Helms Center, which honors the late U.S. Senator Jesse Helms, who served from 1973 to 2003, is located next to the Wingate Town Hall.

Wingate is a town in Union County, North Carolina, United States. As of the 2020 census, Wingate had a population of 4,055.

== History ==
The Wingate Commercial Historic District was listed on the National Register of Historic Places in 2014. It is named for Washington Manly Wingate.

== Geography ==
According to the United States Census Bureau, the town has a total area of 1.7 square miles (4.4 km^{2}), all land.

Wingate is drained by tributaries to Richardson Creek, including Rays Fork and Meadow Branch.

== Demographics ==
Historical population
Census	Pop.	Note	%±
1910	353		—
1920	470		33.1%
1930	526		11.9%
1940	541		2.9%
1950	793		46.6%
1960	1,304		64.4%
1970	2,569		97.0%
1980	2,615		1.8%
1990	2,821		7.9%
2000	2,406		−14.7%
2010	3,491		45.1%
2020	4,055		16.2%
U.S. Decennial Census

=== 2020 census ===
As of the 2020 census, Wingate had a population of 4,055. The median age was 21.5 years. 15.2% of residents were under the age of 18 and 9.6% of residents were 65 years of age or older. For every 100 females there were 78.2 males, and for every 100 females age 18 and over there were 76.2 males age 18 and over.

100.0% of residents lived in urban areas, while 0.0% lived in rural areas.

There were 915 households in Wingate, and 693 were family households. Of all households, 35.4% had children under the age of 18 living in them. 40.1% were married-couple households, 17.4% were households with a male householder and no spouse or partner present, and 37.0% were households with a female householder and no spouse or partner present. About 28.2% of all households were made up of individuals, and 14.3% had someone living alone who was 65 years of age or older.

There were 1,013 housing units, of which 9.7% were vacant. The homeowner vacancy rate was 1.2% and the rental vacancy rate was 9.3%.

Wingate racial composition
Race	Number	Percentage
White (non-Hispanic)	1,924	47.45%
Black or African American (non-Hispanic)	1,315	32.43%
Native American	8	0.2%
Asian	61	1.5%
Pacific Islander	2	0.05%
Other/Mixed	195	4.81%
Hispanic or Latino	550	13.56%

The town is known mainly for Wingate University and the Jesse Helms Center, K-Ci & JoJo and Walter Collin Burleson.

=== 2000 census ===
As of the census of 2000, there were 2,406 people, 751 households, and 464 families residing in the town. The population density was 1,430.2 inhabitants per square mile (552.2/km^{2}). There were 825 housing units at an average density of 490.4 per square mile (189.3/km^{2}). The racial makeup of the town was 60.6% White, 28.8% African American, 0.4% Native American, 0.9% Asian, 7.9% from other races, and 1.4% from two or more races. Hispanic or Latino of any race were 12.4% of the population.

There were 751 households, out of which 30.0% had children under the age of 18 living with them, 41.0% were married couples living together, 17.2% had a female householder with no husband present, and 38.1% were non-families. 27.4% of all households were made up of individuals, and 12.5% had someone living alone who was 65 years of age or older. The average household size was 2.46 and the average family size was 2.99.

In the town, the population was spread out, with 18.7% under the age of 18, 35.0% from 18 to 24, 21.7% from 25 to 44, 15.6% from 45 to 64, and 8.9% who were 65 years of age or older. The median age was 23 years. For every 100 females there were 93.9 males. For every 100 females age 18 and over, there were 93.0 males.

The median income for a household in the town was $33,750, and the median income for a family was $45,250. Males had a median income of $33,173 versus $22,708 for females. The per capita income for the town was $13,884. About 13.8% of families and 20.0% of the population were below the poverty line, including 20.9% of those under age 18 and 21.0% of those age 65 or over.
