= College Park, Maryland =

- City
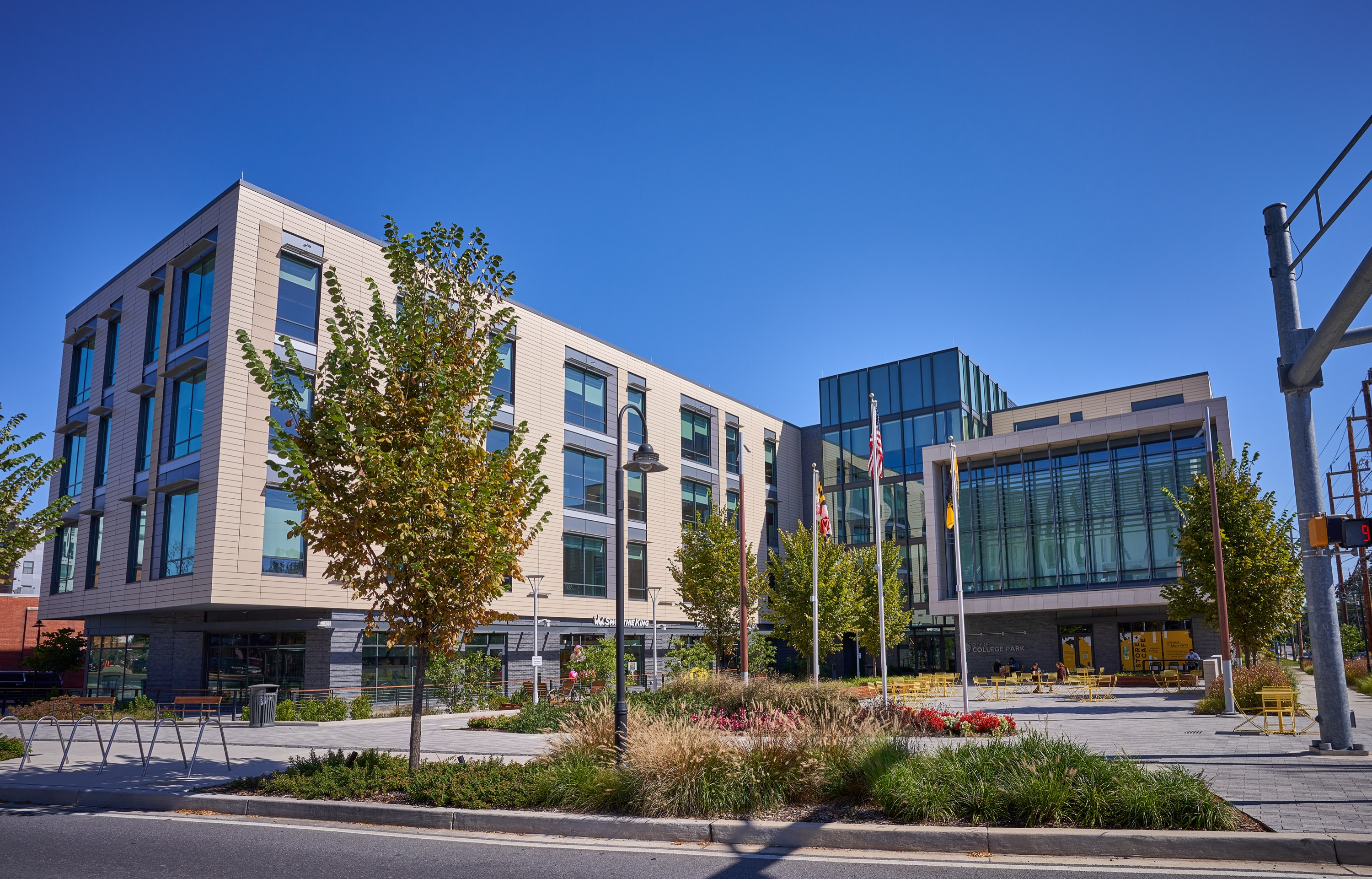
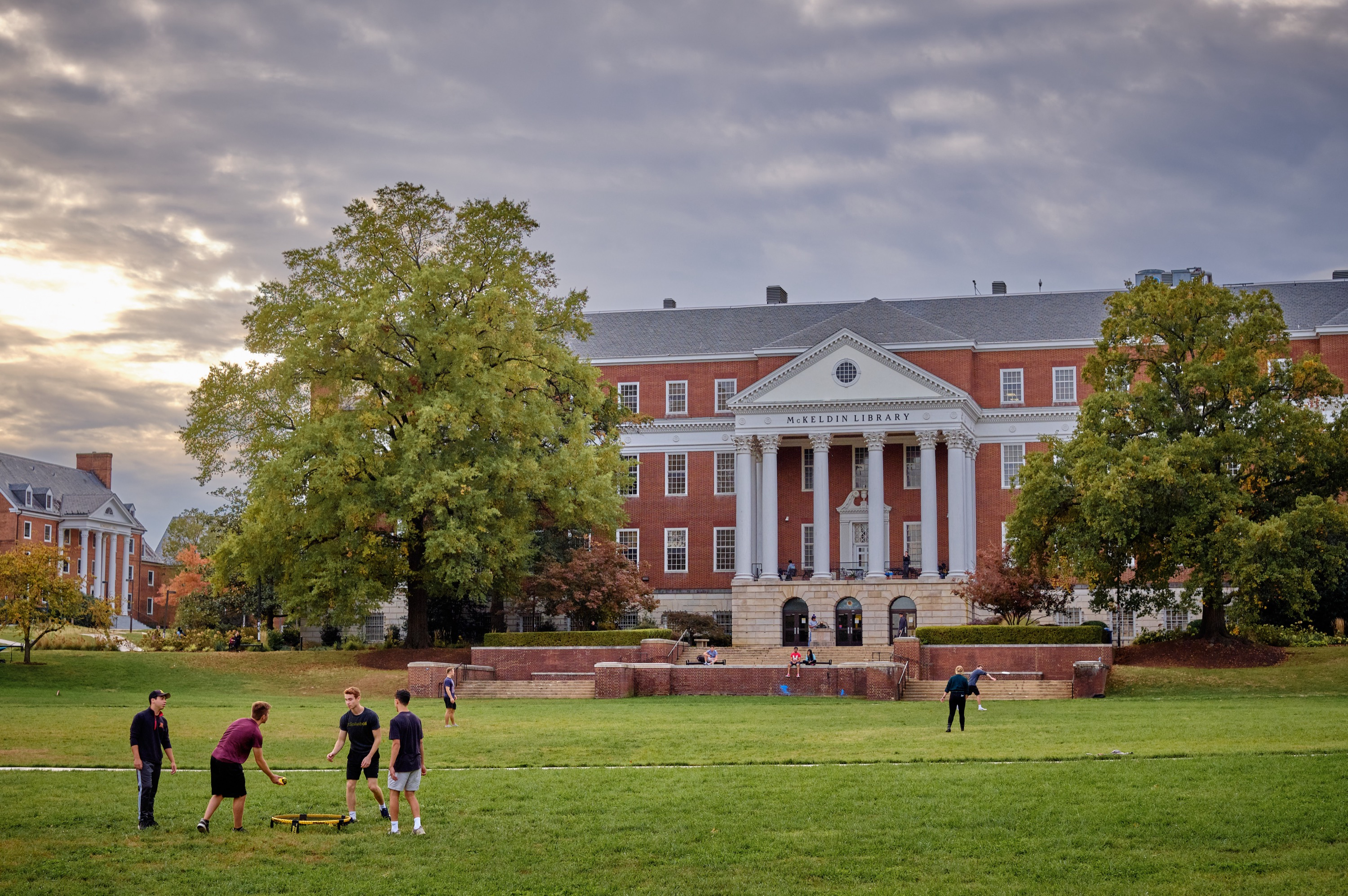
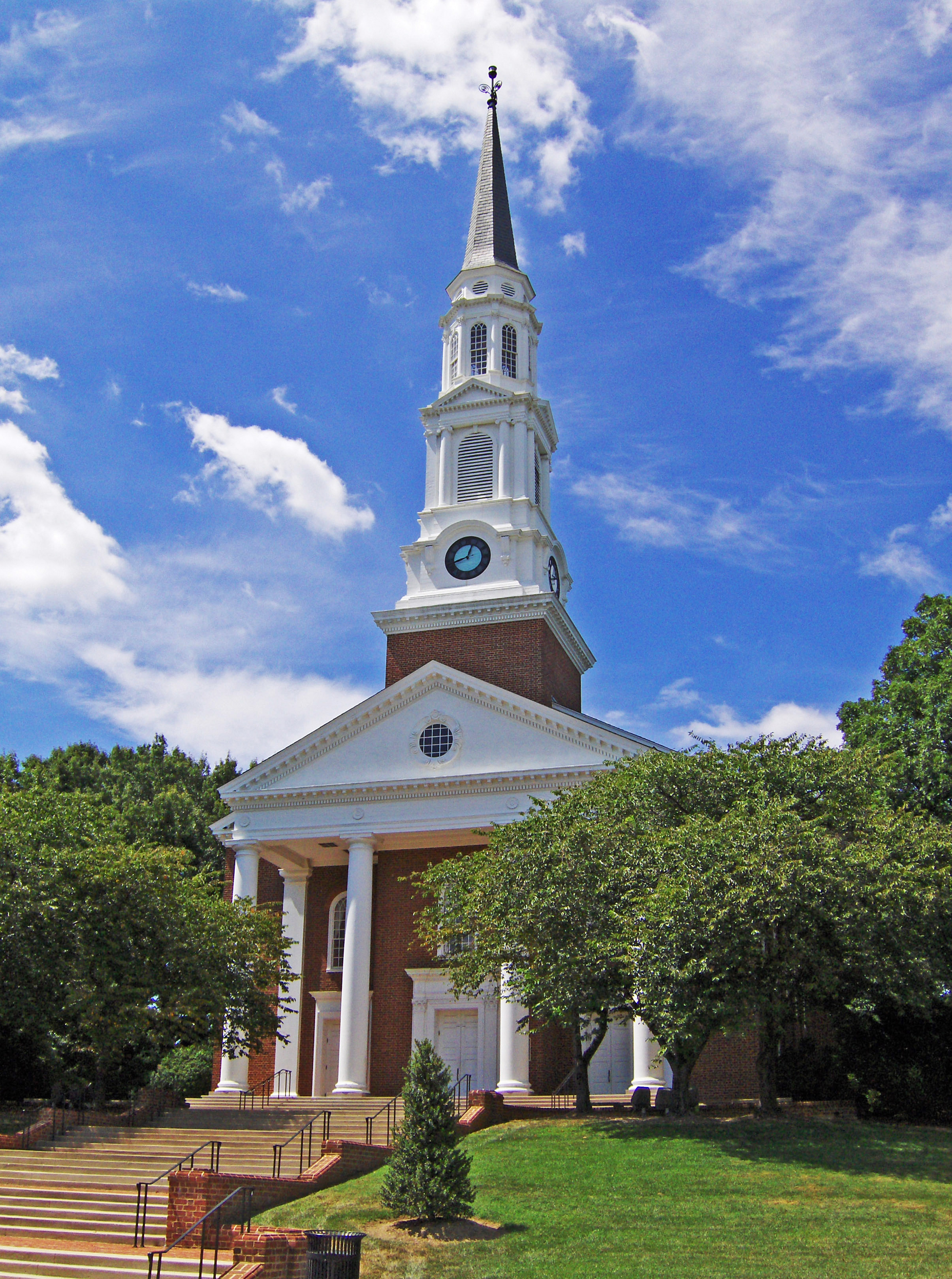
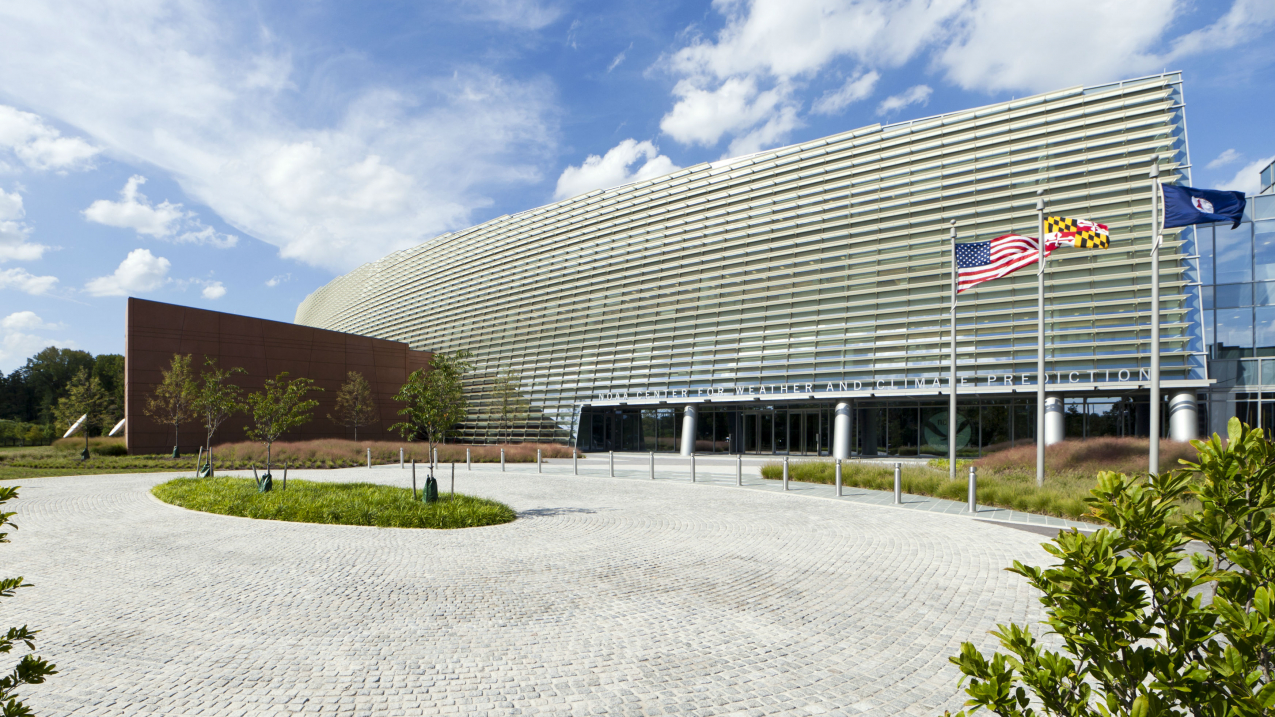
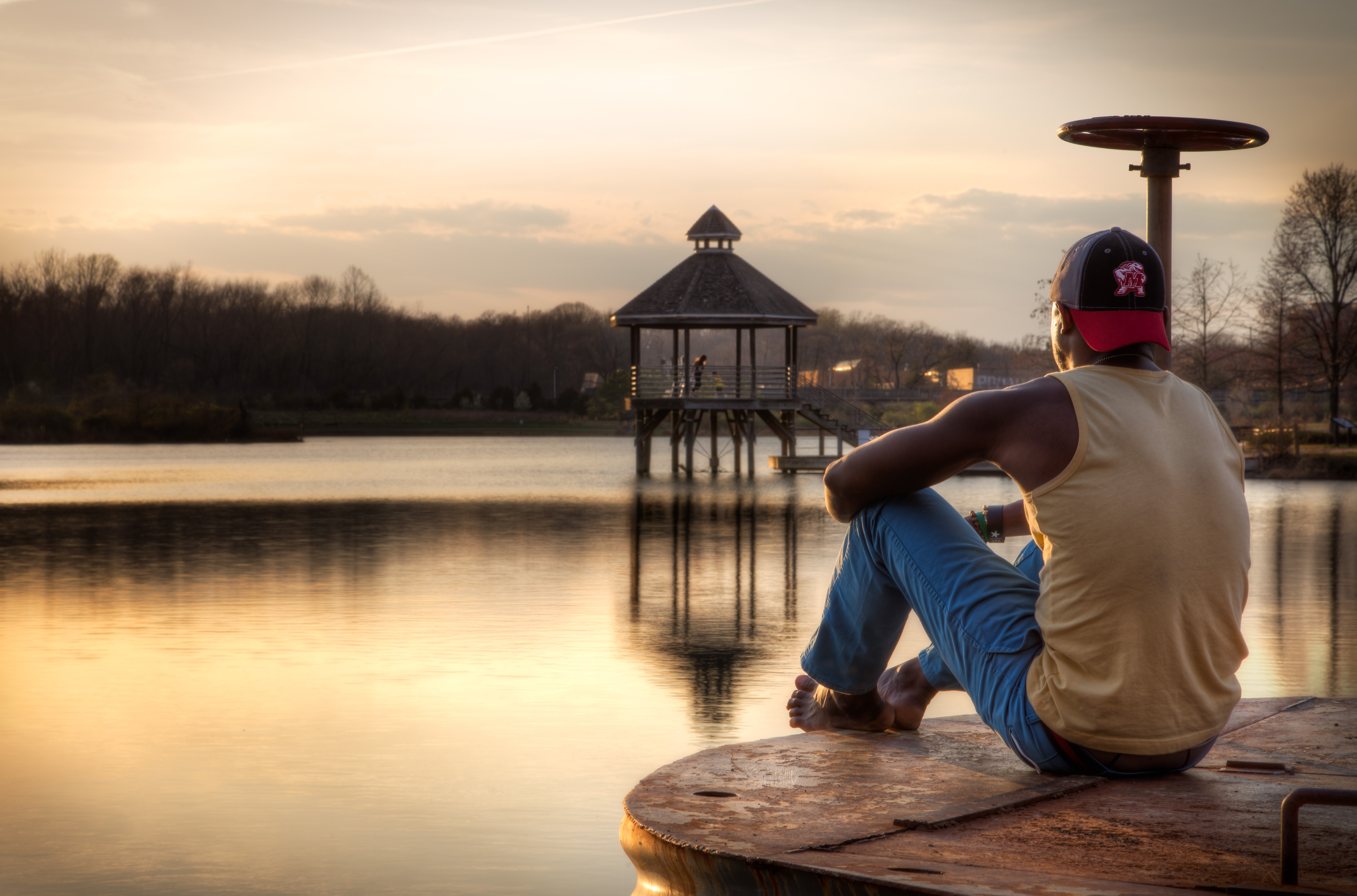
- College Park City Hall University of Maryland Memorial Chapel NOAA Weather Prediction Center Lake Artemesia

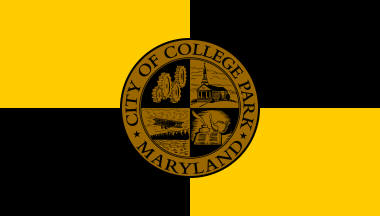
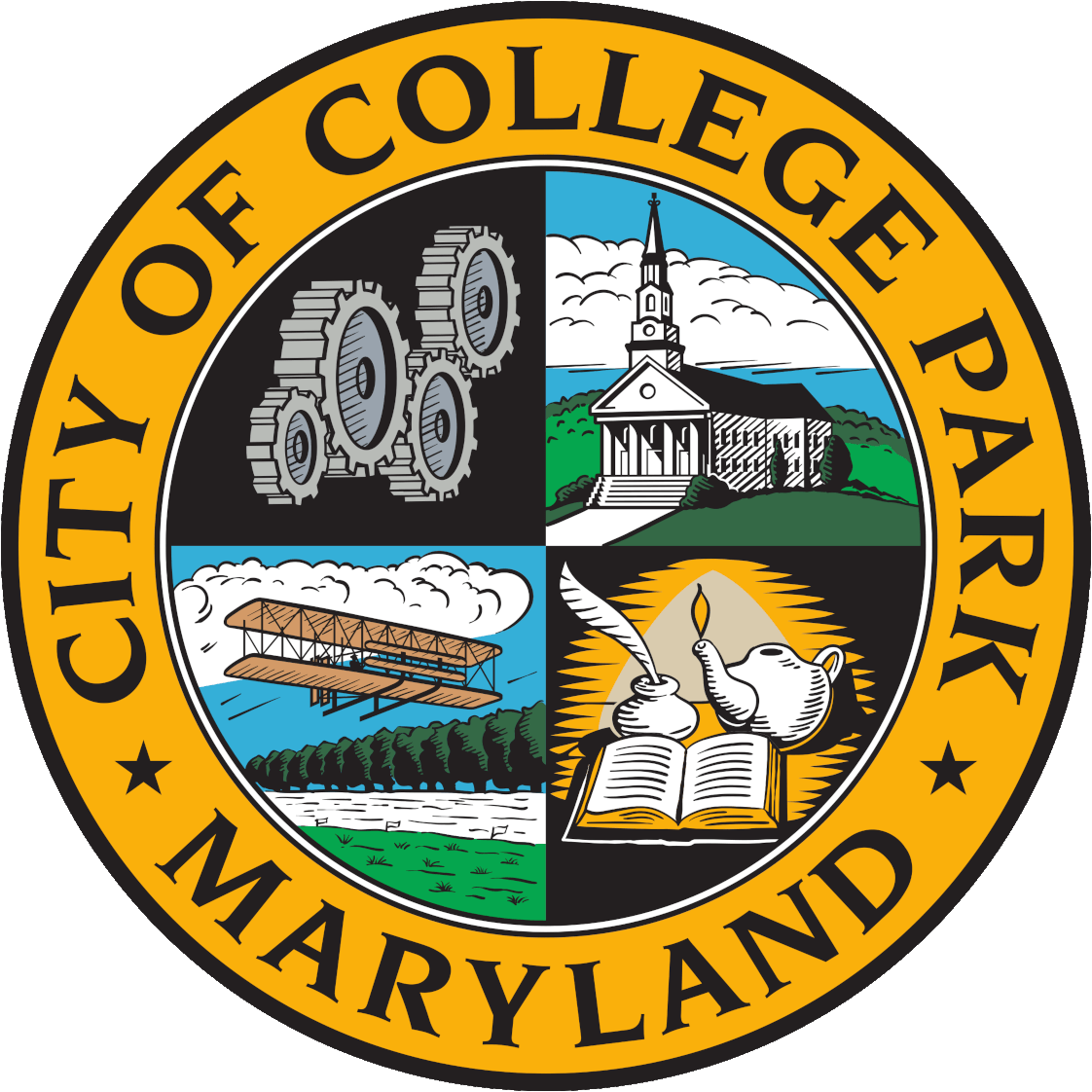
- Flag Seal
- Interactive map of College Park, Maryland
- Location within Maryland Location within the United States
- Coordinates: 38°59′48″N 76°55′39″W
- Country: United States
- State: Maryland
- County: Prince George's
- Founded: 1856
- Incorporated: 1945
- Named for: Proximity to a state college

Government
  - Type: Council–manager
  - Mayor: S.M. Fazlul Kabir

Area
  - Total: 5.68 sq mi (14.72 km^{2})
  - Land: 5.61 sq mi (14.53 km^{2})
  - Water: 0.069 sq mi (0.18 km^{2})
- Elevation: 69 ft (21 m)

Population (2020)
  - Total: 34,740
  - Density: 6,191.0/sq mi (2,390.37/km^{2})
- Time zone: UTC−5 (EST)
  - Summer (DST): UTC−4 (EDT)
- ZIP Codes: 20740–20742
- Area code: 301, 240
- FIPS code: 24-18750
- GNIS feature ID: 2390578
- Website: www.collegeparkmd.gov

College Park is a city in Prince George's County, Maryland, United States, which is located approximately four miles (6.4 km) from the northeast border of Washington, D.C. Its population was 34,740 at the 2020 United States census. It is the home of the University of Maryland, College Park.

College Park is also home to federal agencies such as the National Archives at College Park (Archives II), NOAA's Weather Prediction Center, and the FDA's Center for Food Safety and Applied Nutrition, as well as tech companies such as IonQ (quantum computing) and Cybrary (cyber security).

College Park Airport, established in 1909, is the world's oldest continuously operated airport. The College Park Aviation Museum, attached to the airport and an affiliate of the Smithsonian Institution, houses antique and reproduction aircraft as well as materials relating to early aviation history.

In 2014, the University of Maryland launched the Greater College Park initiative, a $2 billion public-private investment to "revitalize the community around the university, develop a robust Discovery District and create one of the nation’s best college towns." As a result, the city is experiencing significant development that has led to new housing, office space, schools, grocery stores, restaurants, and other amenities.

== History ==
The earliest evidence of human activity in the College Park area was found at an archeological site just south of Archives II. Projectile points of Clagett and Vernon styles dating from 3000 to 2600 BC were recovered, a notable find given their location away from a river. This finding together with other similar ones indicate that the native American population became more sedentary in the Late Archaic period as the availability of local food supply increased, and social complexity grew. By the time Europeans first arrived and colonized the region in the early 17th century, the various native American groups had aligned themselves into a chiefdom under the Piscataway people.

Throughout the 17th and 18th centuries, the European settlers lived on large plantations, some holding the original grants under Lord Baltimore. In College Park, there are records for Toaping Castle, a land grant to Col. Isaac Walker from c. 1745 in the area between Branchville, Greenbelt, and Berwyn Heights, and for the Calvert family's Riversdale, which included parts of South College Park. One of the oldest buildings in the city, the Old Parish House dating from 1817 was initially a farm building in the latter estate.

=== 19th century ===
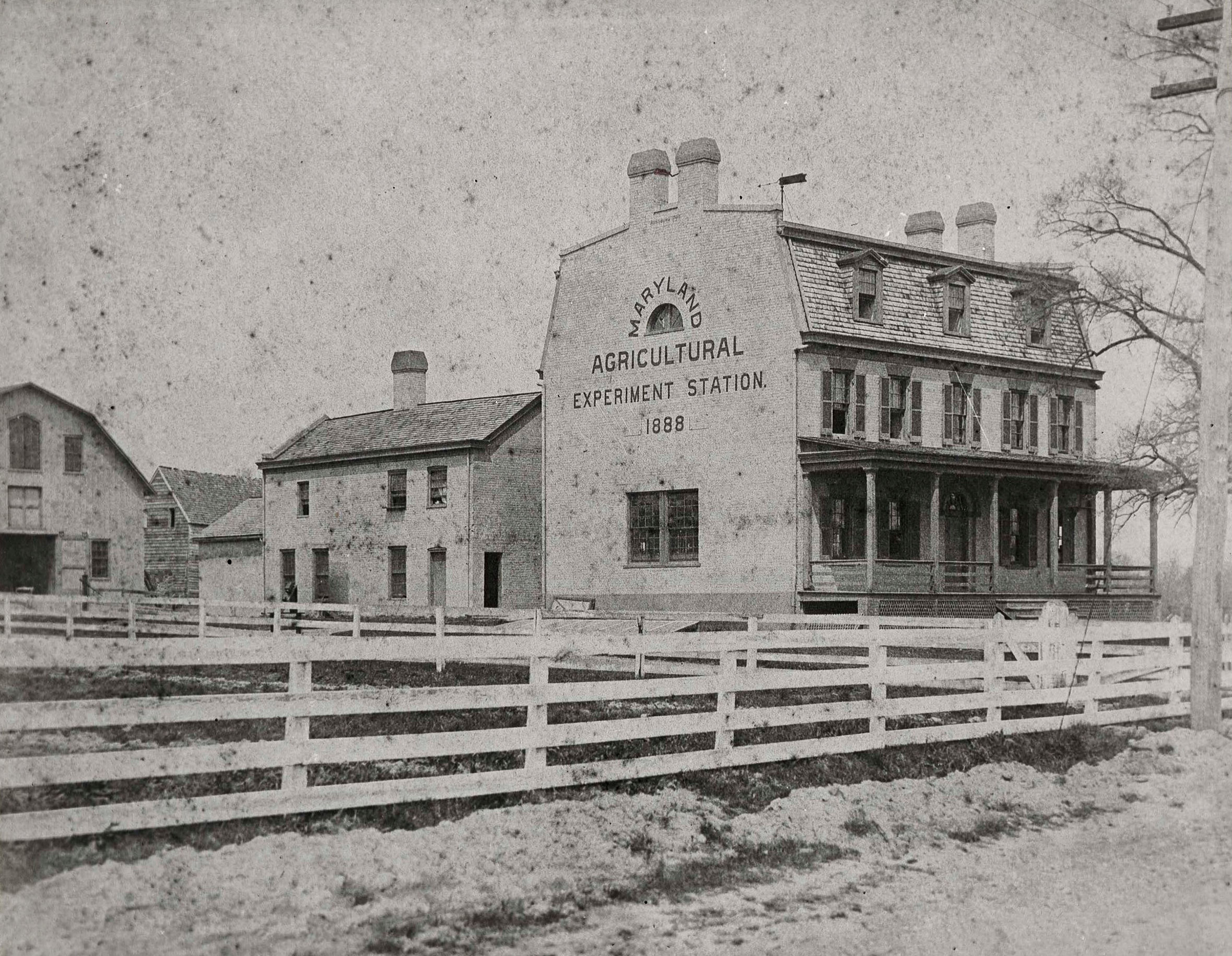
Rossborough Inn, part of the Maryland Agricultural College c. 1901

The oldest standing building in College Park is the Rossborough Inn, whose construction was completed in 1803. The forerunner of today's University of Maryland was chartered in 1856 as the Maryland Agricultural College, and would become a land grant college in February 1864.

The original College Park subdivision was first platted in 1872 by Eugene Campbell. Early maps called the local post office "College Lawn". The area remained undeveloped and was re-platted in 1889 by John O. Johnson and Samuel Curriden, Washington real estate developers. The original 125-acre (0.51 km^{2}) tract was divided into a grid-street pattern with long, narrow building lots, with a standard lot size of 50 by 200 feet (15 by 61 m). College Park originally included single-family residences constructed in the Shingle, Queen Anne, and Stick styles, as well as modest vernacular dwellings.

By the turn of the century, College Park was being developed rapidly by catering to those who were seeking to escape the crowded Washington, D.C., as well as to a rapidly expanding staff of college faculty and employees.

=== 20th century ===
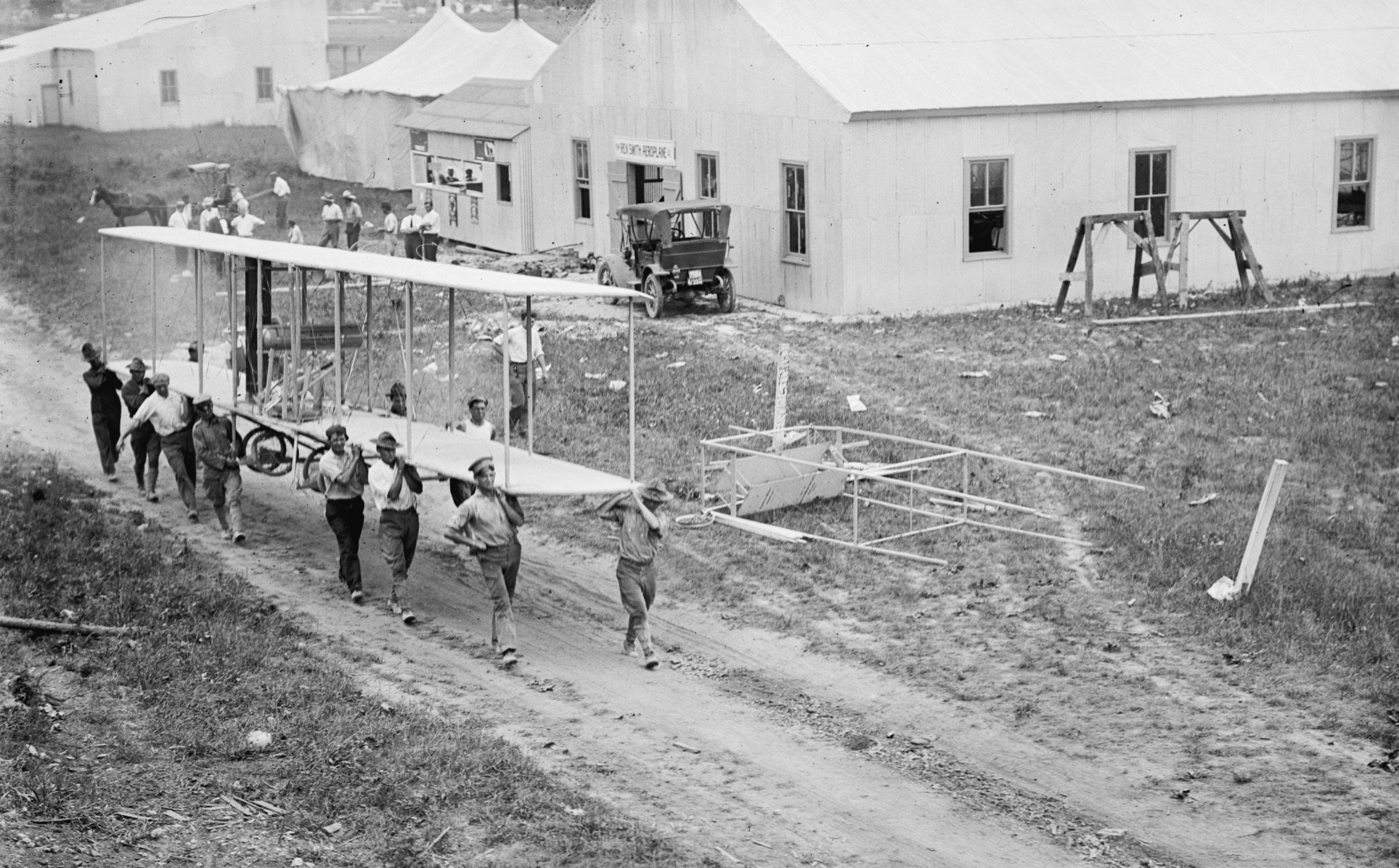
Army workers carrying the wreck of the Wright brothers' plane at the College Park airport in 1911

In 1909 the College Park Airport was established by the United States Army Signal Corps to serve as a training location for Wilbur Wright to instruct military officers to fly in the US government's first airplane. Civilian aircraft began flying from College Park Airport as early as December 1911, making it the world's oldest continuously operated airport.

Commercial development in the city increased in the 1920s, aided by the increased automobile traffic and the growing campus along Baltimore Avenue/Route 1. By the late 1930s, most of the original subdivision had been partially developed. Several fraternities and sororities from the University of Maryland built houses in the neighborhood. After World War II, construction consisted mostly of infill of ranch and split-level houses. After incorporation in 1945, the city continued to grow, and a municipal center was built in 1959.

The Lakeland neighborhood was developed beginning in 1890 around the Baltimore and Ohio Railroad, whose Branchville and Calvert Road depots were located approximately one mile to the north and south, respectively. Lakeland was created by Edwin Newman, who improved the original 238 acres (0.96 km^{2}) located to the west of the railroad. He also built a number of the original homes, a small town hall, and a general store. The area was originally envisioned as a resort-type community. However, due to the flood-prone, low-lying topography, the neighborhood became an area of African-American settlement. Around 1900, the Baltimore Gold Fish Company built five artificial lakes in the area to spawn goldfish and rarer species of fish. By 1903 Lakeland was an established African-American community with a school and two churches. Lakeland was central in a group of African American communities located along Route One through Prince George's County. Lakeland High School opened in 1928 with funding from the Rosenwald Fund, the African American community and the county. Lakeland High served all African American students in the northern half of the county until 1950 when it was converted to a facility for lower grades. The community's first Rosenwald school was a new elementary which opened in 1925.

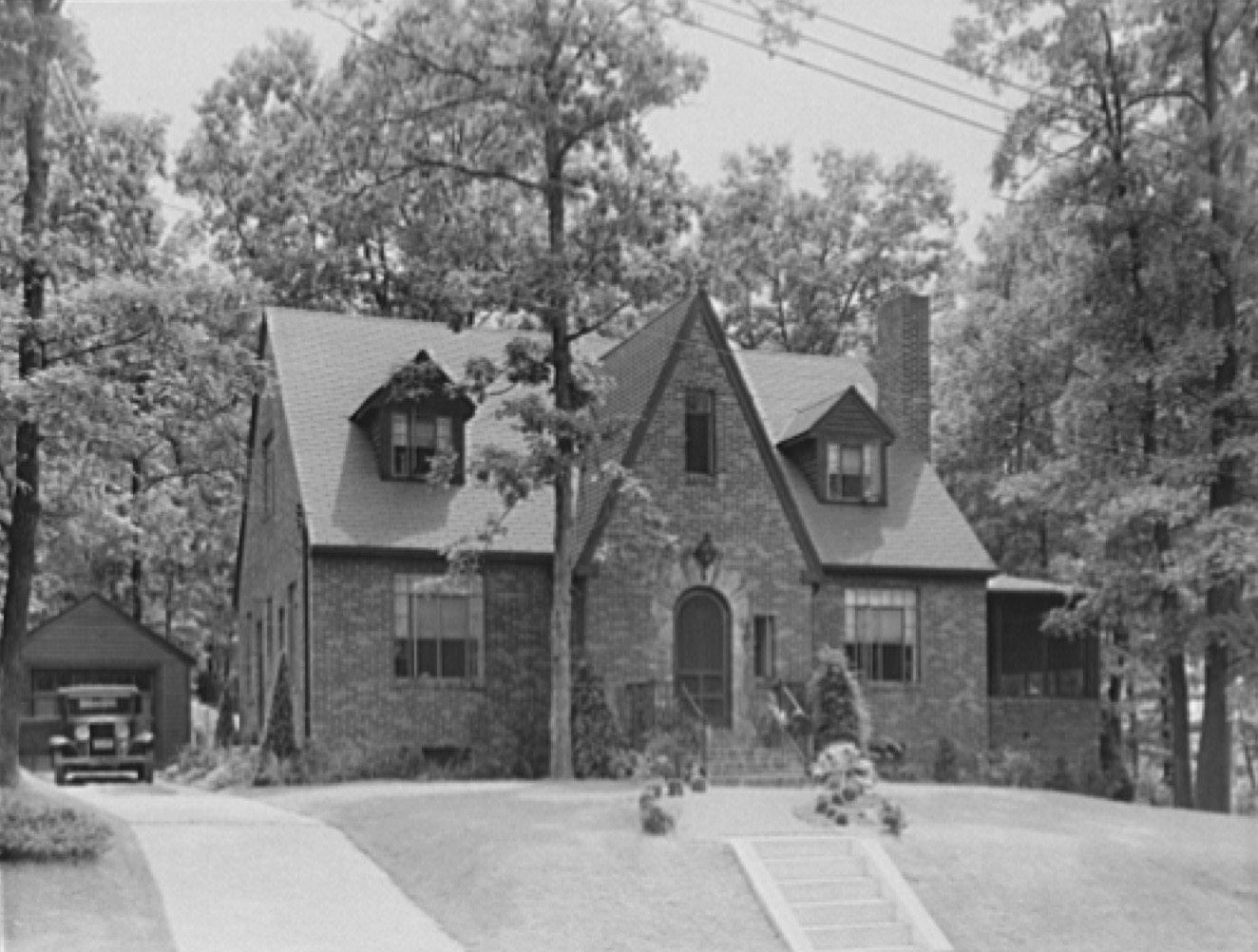
Potomac Electric Power Company House in College Park, 1938

The Berwyn neighborhood was developed beginning about 1885 adjacent to the Baltimore and Ohio Railroad. It was created by Francis Shannabrook, a Pennsylvanian who purchased a tract of land between Baltimore Avenue and the railroad tracks. Shannabrook established a small depot, built a general store, and erected approximately 15 homes in the area to attract moderate-income families looking to move out of Washington. The neighborhood began to grow after 1900 when the City and Suburban Electric Railway entered the area. By 1925, approximately 100 single-family homes existed, mostly two-story, wood-frame buildings. The community housing continued to develop in the 1930s and 1940s with one story bungalows, Cape Cods, and Victorians and, later, raised ranches and split-level homes.

The Daniels Park neighborhood was developed, beginning in 1905 on the east and west sides of the City and Suburban Electric Railway in north College Park. Daniels Park was created by Edward Daniels on 47 acres (19 ha) of land. This small residential subdivision was improved with single-family houses arranged along a grid pattern of streets. The houses—built between 1905 and the 1930s—range in style from American Foursquares to bungalows.

The Hollywood neighborhood was developed in the early 20th century along the City and Suburban Electric Railway. Edward Daniels, the developer of Daniels Park, planned the Hollywood subdivision as a northern extension of that earlier community. Development in Hollywood was slow until after World War II, when Albert Turner acquired large tracts of the northern part of the neighborhood in the late 1940s. Turner was able to develop and market brick and frame three-bedroom bungalows beginning in 1950. By 1952, an elementary school had been built. Hollywood Neighborhood Park, a 21-acre (8.5 ha) facility along the Baltimore and Ohio Railroad line, is operated by the Maryland-National Capital Park and Planning Commission.

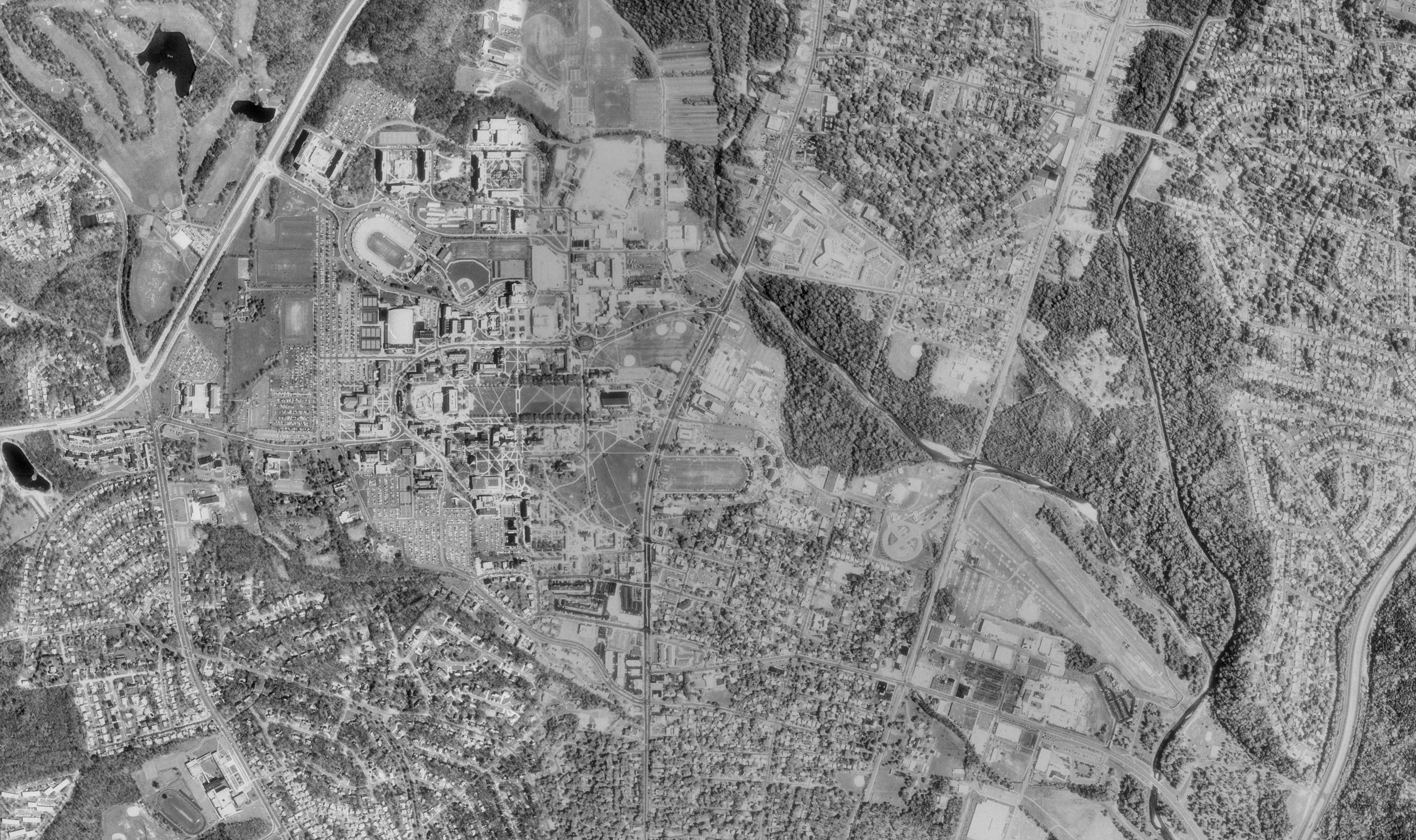
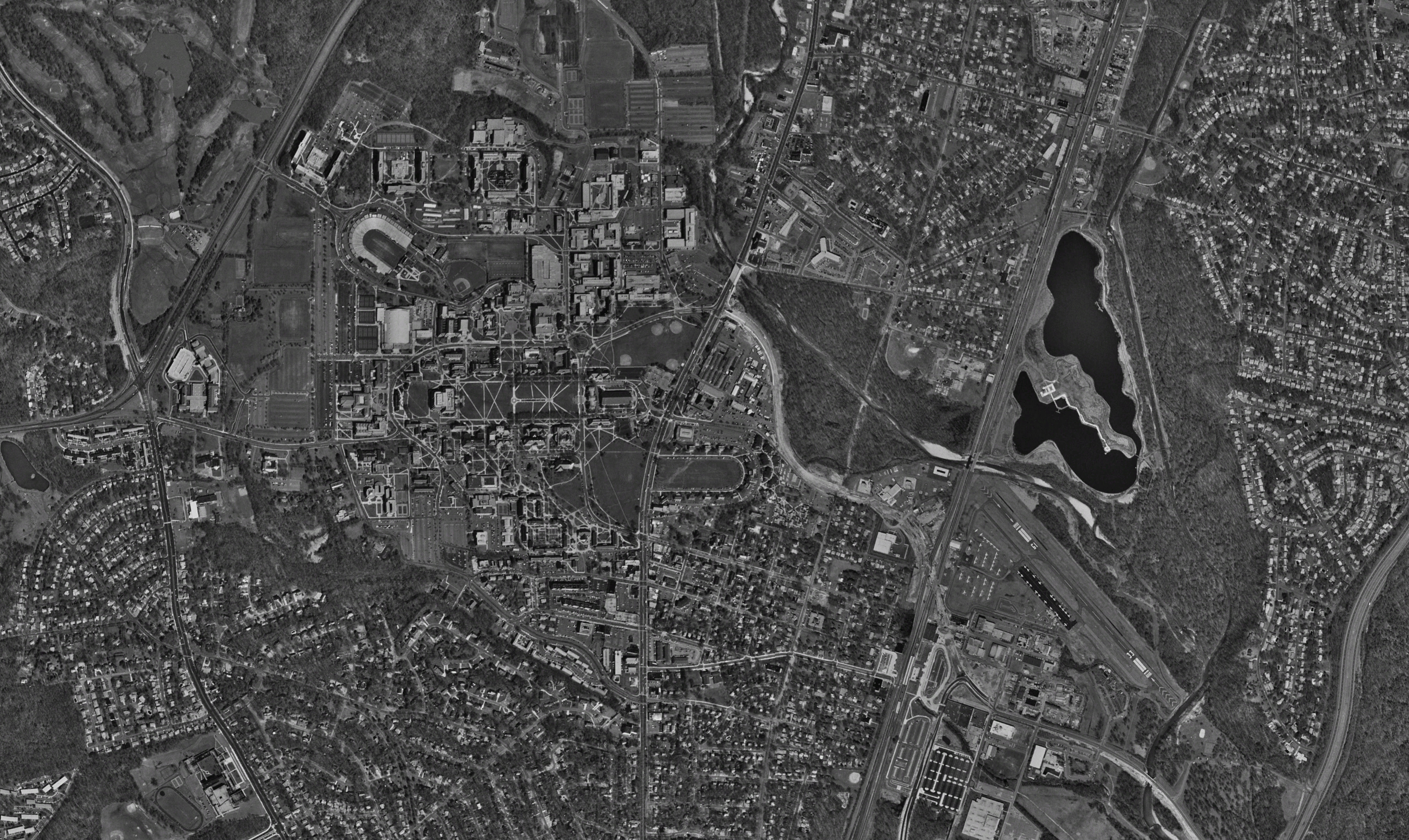
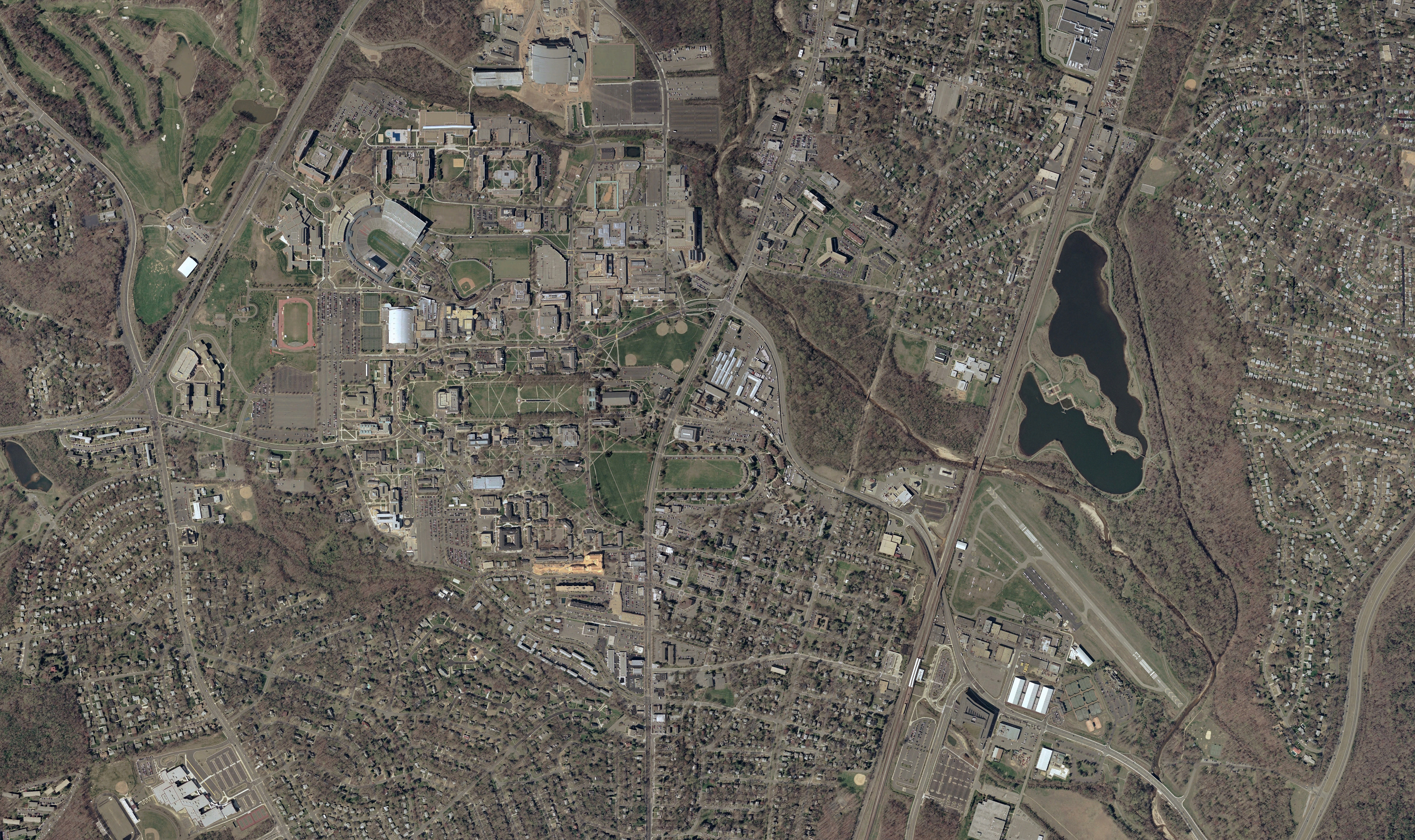
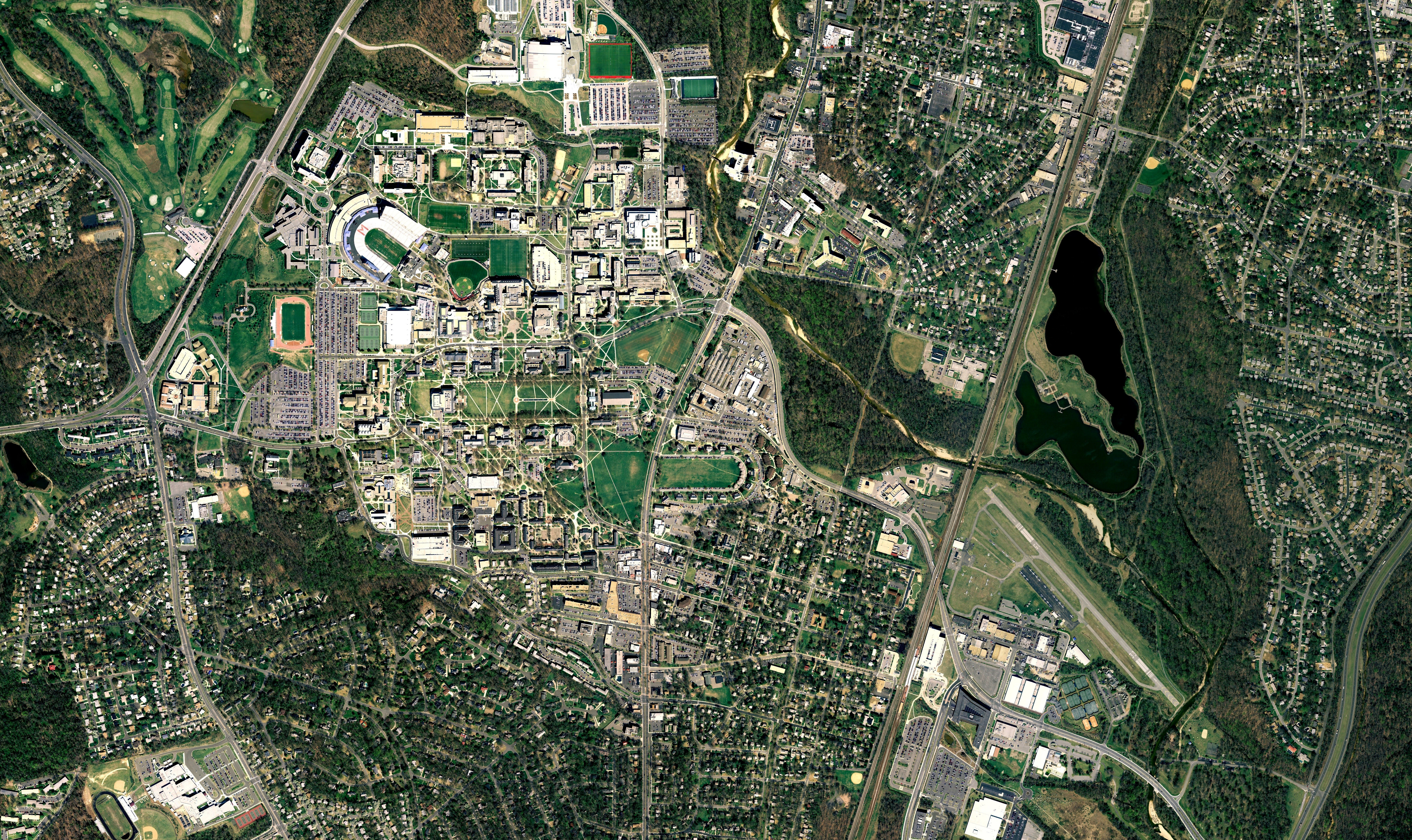
Aerial view of the evolution of downtown College Park between 1989 and 2007. Lake Artemesia can be seen on the right from 1994 onwards.

In 1943, due to World War II efforts to conserve rail transport, the Washington Senators relocated their spring training camp to College Park. The locations of 1943 Major League Baseball spring training camps were limited to an area east of the Mississippi River and north of the Ohio River.

During the 1960s through the 1980s an Urban Renewal Project took place within the historic African American community of Lakeland. This project was carried out in the face of the opposition of the community's residents and resulted in the redevelopment of approximately two thirds of the community. It displaced 104 of Lakeland's 150 households.

The College Park–University of Maryland station opened in 1993, connecting College Park to Washington D.C. by means of Metro. During its construction in the late 1980s, sand and gravel were excavated from the site of an adjacent small lake. In return, Metro built Lake Artemesia on the site, a large recreational area that includes aquatic gardens, fishing piers, and hiker-biker trails.

=== 21st century ===
By the turn of the 21st century, College Park began experiencing significant development pressure. Both students and city residents acknowledged the city's lack of amenities and poor sense of place. In 2002, the city and county passed the Route 1 Sector Plan, which allowed and encouraged mixed use development along College Park's main roadway. In July 2006, a group of students created Rethink College Park—a community group providing a website to share information about development and to encourage public dialogue. Early mixed-used projects along Baltimore Avenue included the View I (2006) and II (2010), Mazza Grandmarc (2010), and the Varsity (2011). In 2013 the College Park City-University Partnership—a nonprofit funded by the University of Maryland and the city of College Park—launched the College Park Academy aiming to improve the perception of local public schools.

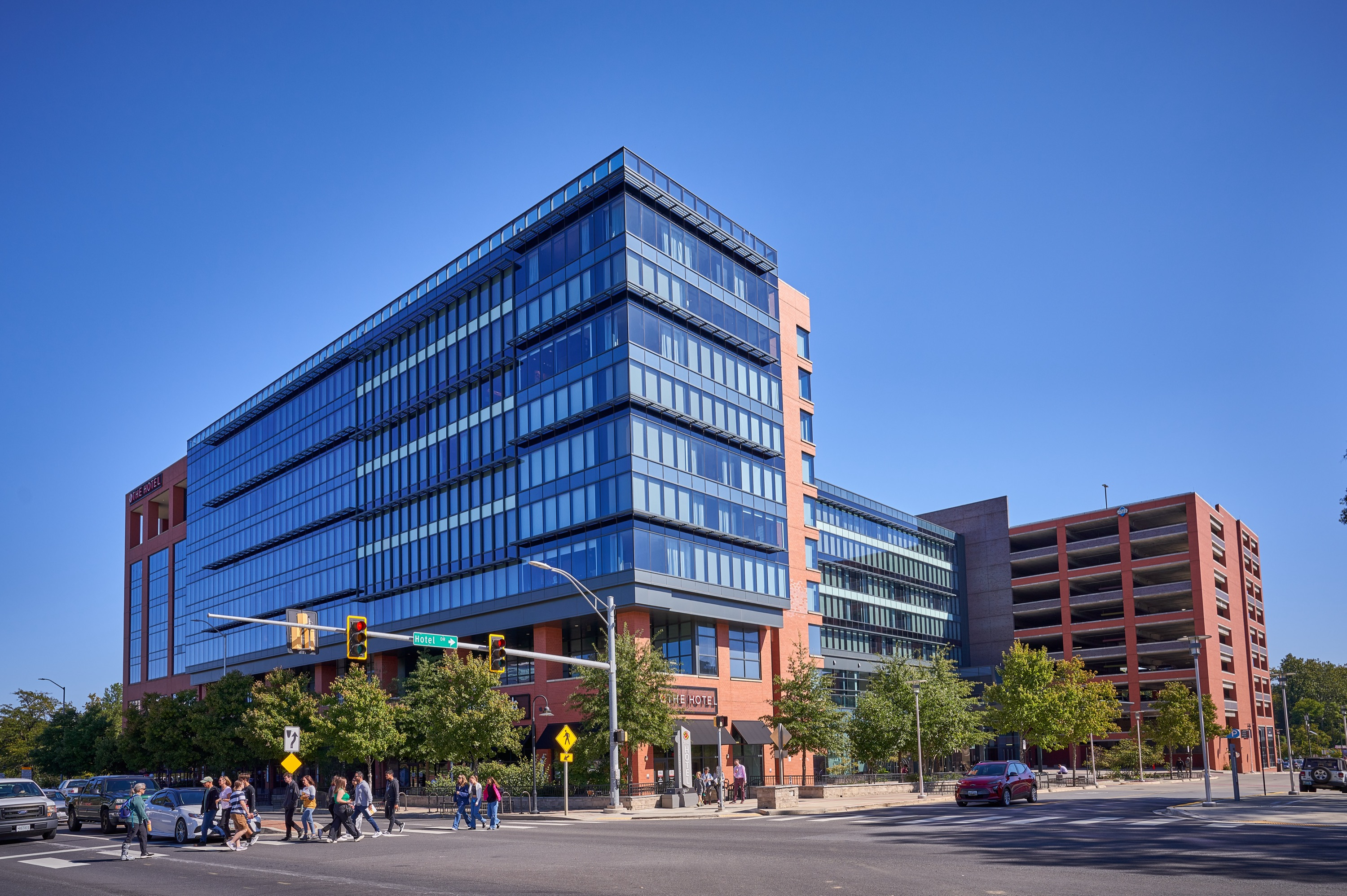
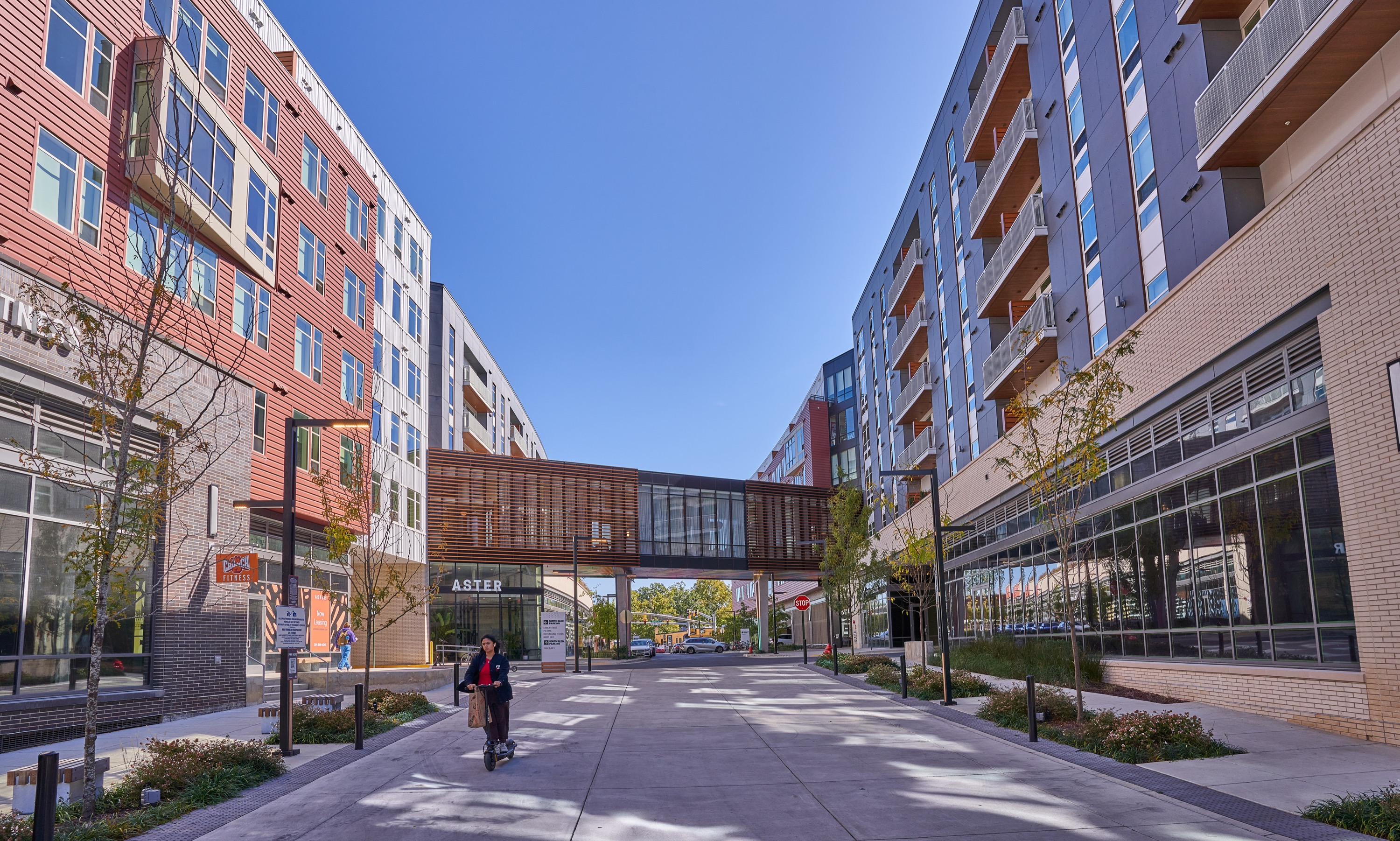
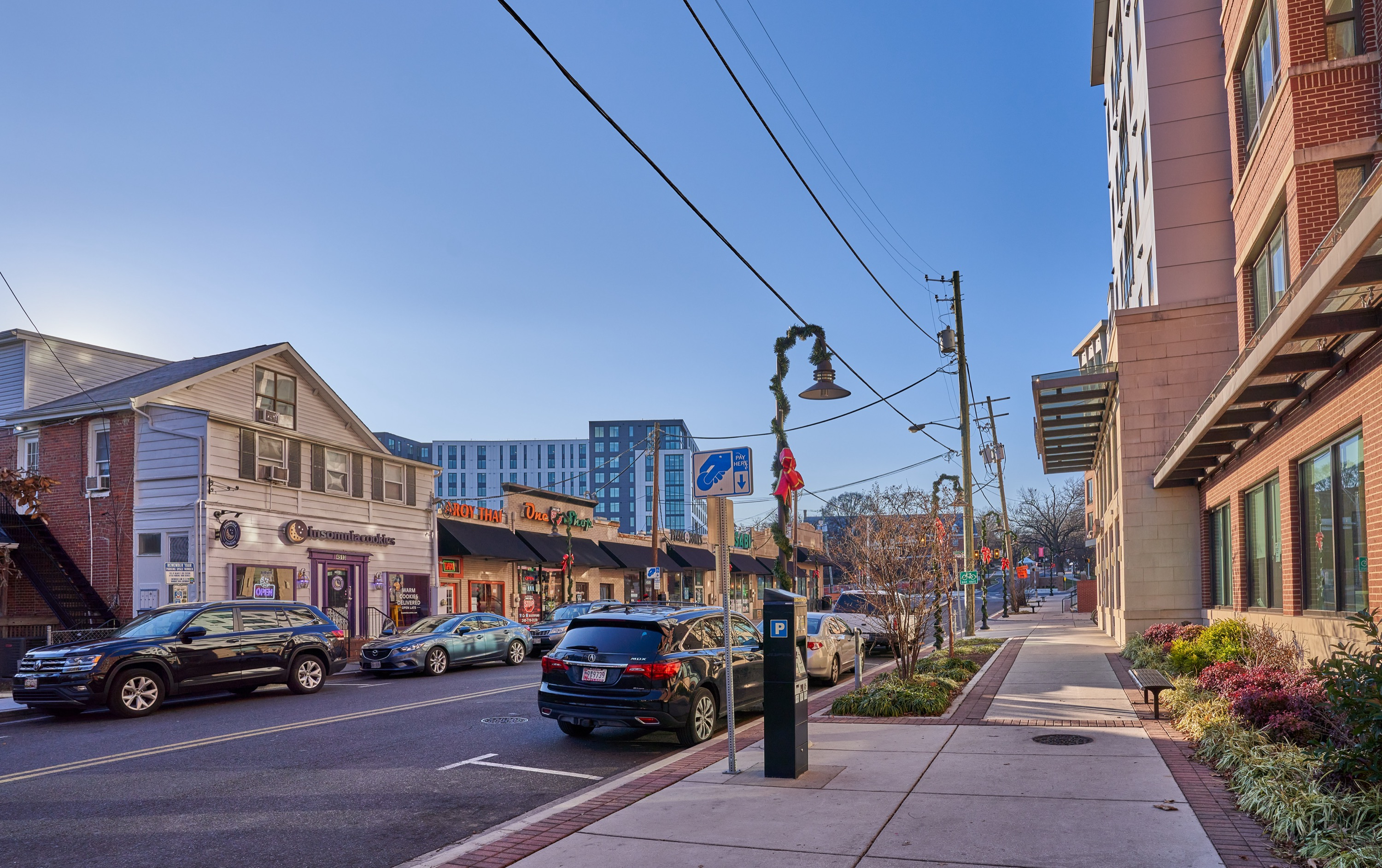
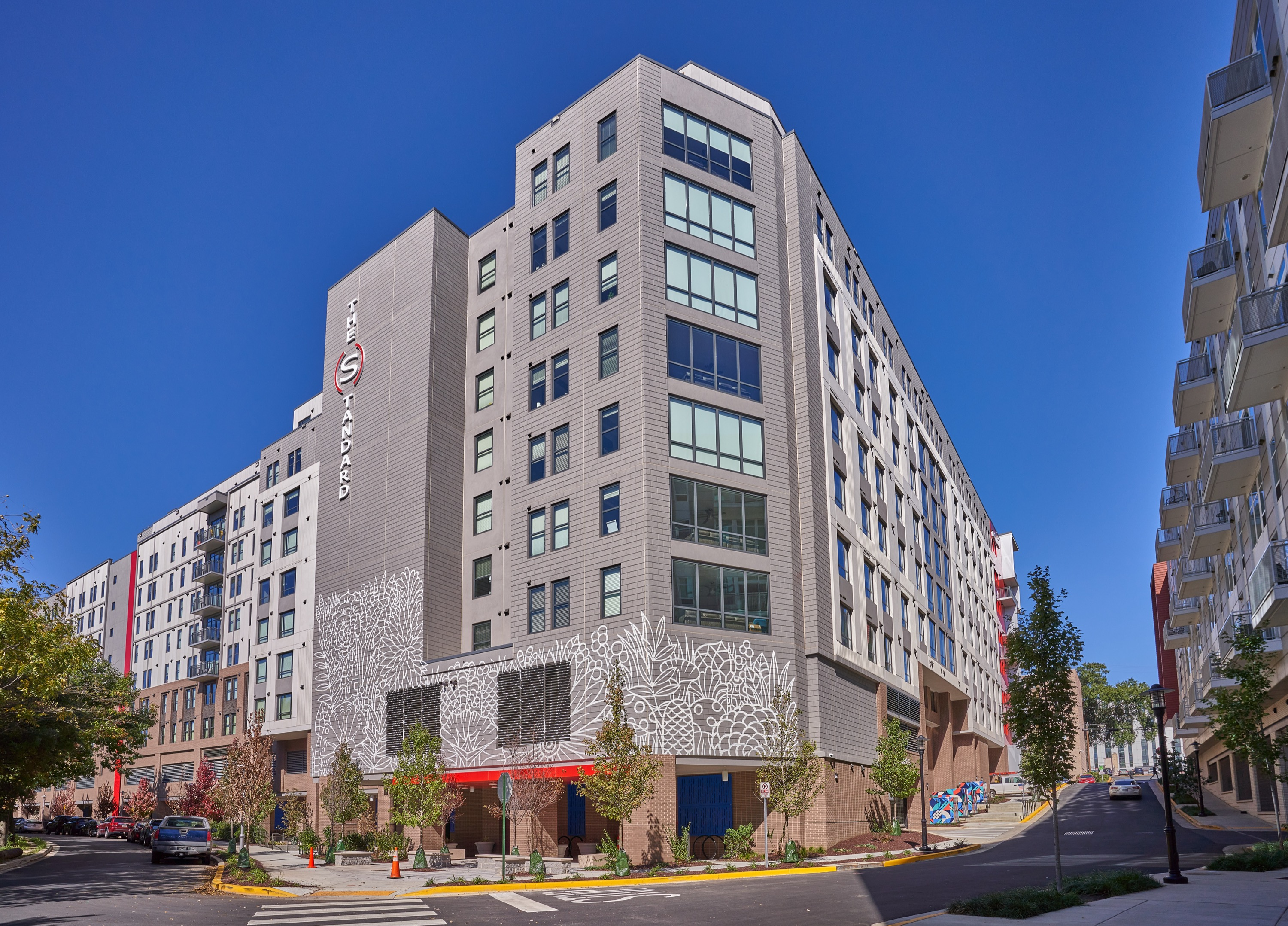
The Hotel at UMD and mixed-use projects built as part of the Greater College Park initiative

Development accelerated after Wallace Loh became the president of the University of Maryland in 2010 and relations between the university and the city improved. It was recognized that the university could not compete if the students, faculty, and staff could not live in College Park so the Greater College Park initiative, a $2 billion public-private investment to revitalize the community around the university aiming to create one of the nation's best college towns, was launched in 2014. Some of the developments that occurred as a result of this initiative included the 4-star Hotel at UMD in 2017 and the Cambria in 2018, the first hotels built in the city in over half a century, and the construction of the College Park City Hall in 2021, a joint venture between the city and the university that provides offices for both as well as retail space and a public plaza. This plaza holds music performances, markets, and city events throughout the year that contributed towards the revitalization of College Park's downtown. The university also launched the Discovery District, its business and research park, and promoted several mixed-used apartment high-rises such as the Aster (2022) or the Union (2024) that brought along new restaurants, shops, and grocery stores.

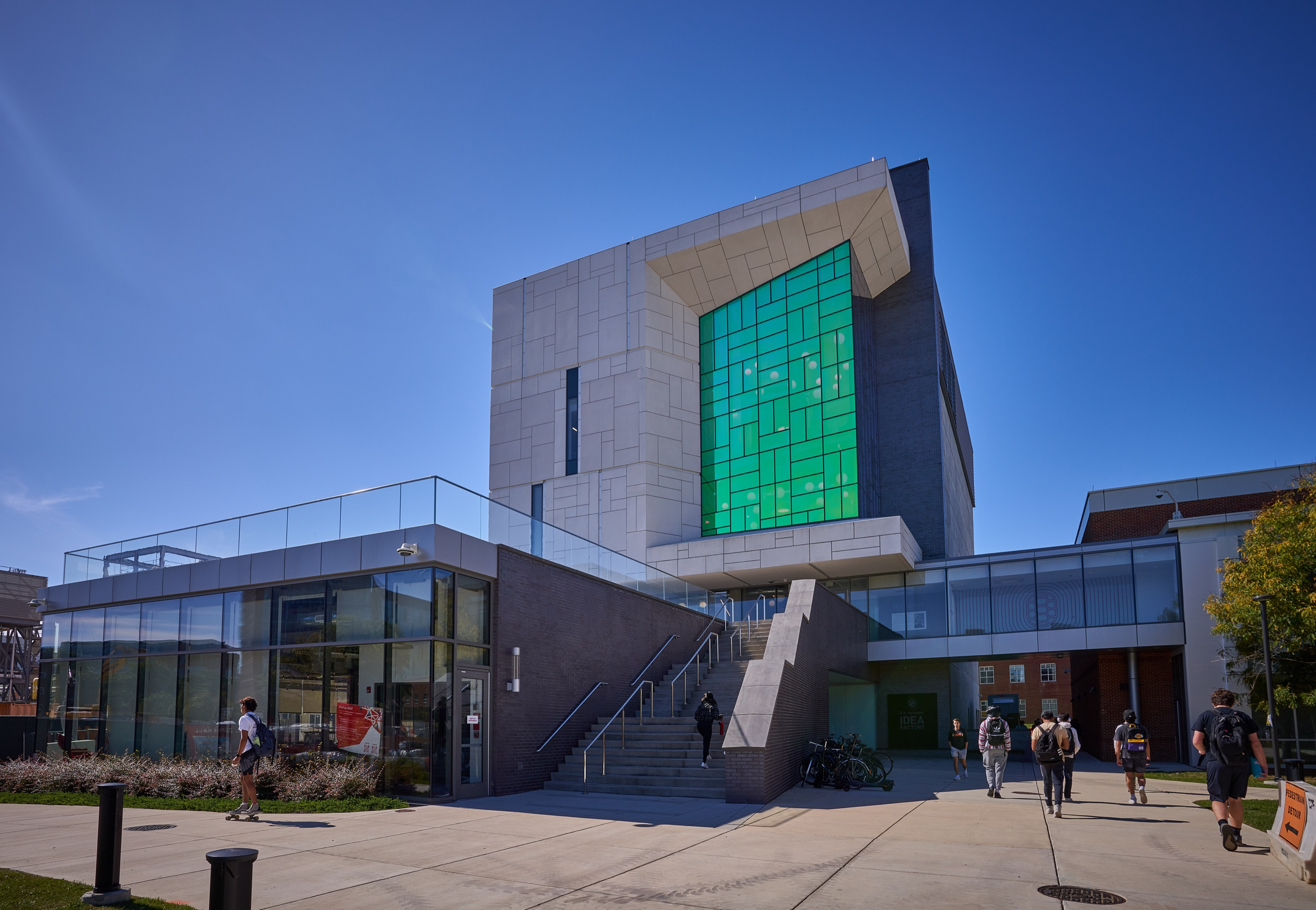
The IDEA (Innovate, Design and Engineer for America) factory at the University of Maryland College Park

This development has been complemented by two major infrastructure projects: the Purple Line, which will provide direct light-rail connections from College Park to Bethesda, Silver Spring, and New Carrolton, and the reconstruction of a portion of Baltimore Avenue into a boulevard with a planted median, new bicycle lanes, and continuous sidewalks. Additionally, the University of Maryland has added several state-of-the-art facilities on their campus, including the Iribe Center for computer science and engineering, the Thurgood Marshall Hall for the public policy school, and the IDEA factory for engineering and entrepreneurship.

On June 9, 2020, the city government passed a "Resolution of the Mayor and Council of the City of College Park Renouncing Systemic Racism and Declaring Support of Black Lives" which recognized harm done to the historic African American community of Lakeland. In it, "the Mayor and Council acknowledge and apologize for our city's past history of oppression, particularly with regards to the Lakeland community, and actively seek opportunities for accountability and truth-telling about past injustice, and aggressively seek opportunities for restorative justice".

On March 2, 2023, Patrick Wojahn, who had served as College Park's mayor since 2015, resigned after being arrested on child pornography charges. Wojahn pleaded guilty to over 100 counts and was sentenced to 150 years with 120 years suspended.

On November 8, 2023, the parking lot on the Greenbelt Metro station, adjacent to North College Park, was selected to host the future FBI headquarters. The construction of this facility is expected to further accelerate and consolidate the development of College Park.

== Geography ==
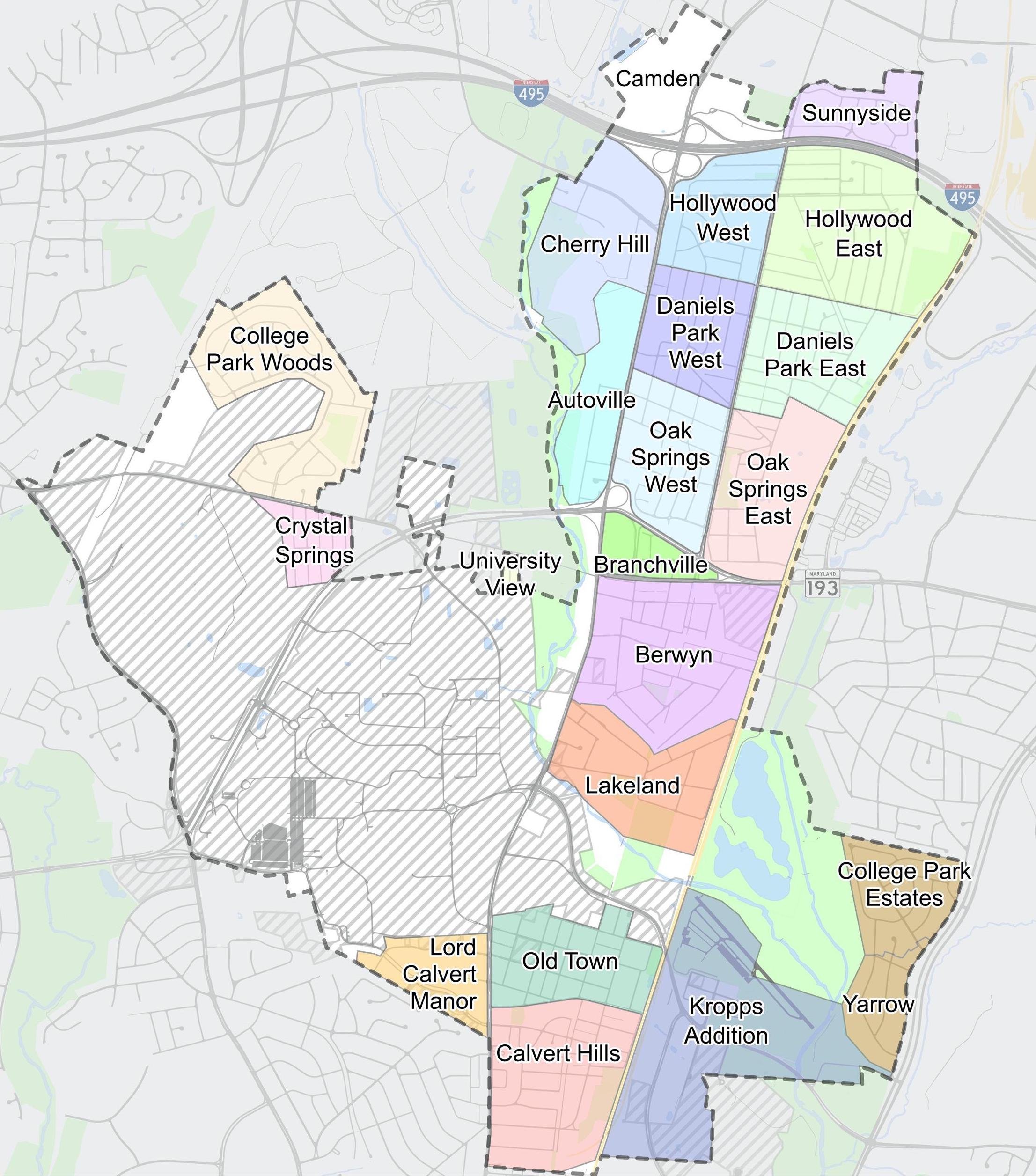
Neighborhoods in College Park, MD

College Park is located in Prince George's County, Maryland. The city is also part of the Washington metropolitan area, with all of its neighborhoods except for Camden and Sunnyside lying inside the Capital Beltway. It is bordered to the North by Beltsville, to the East by Greenbelt and Berwyn Heights, to the South by Riverdale Park and University Park, and to the West by Hyattsville and Adelphi.

The city straddles two small streams, Paint Branch and Indian Creek. The confluence of these two streams is located on the South-East corner of the city, next to the College Park Airport, and results in the Northeast branch Anacostia river. This river is a tributary of the Anacostia river, which itself is a tributary of the Potomac river that flows into the Chesapeake Bay. College Park has a total area of 5.68 square miles (14.71 km^{2}), of which 5.64 square miles (14.61 km^{2}) is land and 0.04 square miles (0.10 km^{2}) is water.

=== Neighborhoods ===
The neighborhoods that were part of the initial incorporation of the city in 1945 (Calvert Hills, Old Town, Lakeland, Berwyn, Branchville, Oak Springs, Daniel's Park, and Hollywood) plus Sunnyside lie in between the Washington-Baltimore CSX railway tracks and Route 1/Baltimore Avenue. West of Baltimore Avenue lie Lord Calvert Manor, College Park Woods, Crystal Springs, Acerdale (University View), Autoville, Cherry Hill, and Camden. East of the CSX tracks lie College Park Estates and Yarrow.

These neighborhoods are primarily residential. They exhibit a variety of architectural styles including Queen Anne and Colonial Revival, and, in later constructions, American Foursquare, Cape Cod, and bungalow. Commercial activity is concentrated along Baltimore Avenue, Greenbelt Road, and Berwyn Road. Starting in 2017 commercial development also started expanding along Knox Road, Hartwick Road, and Calvert Road.

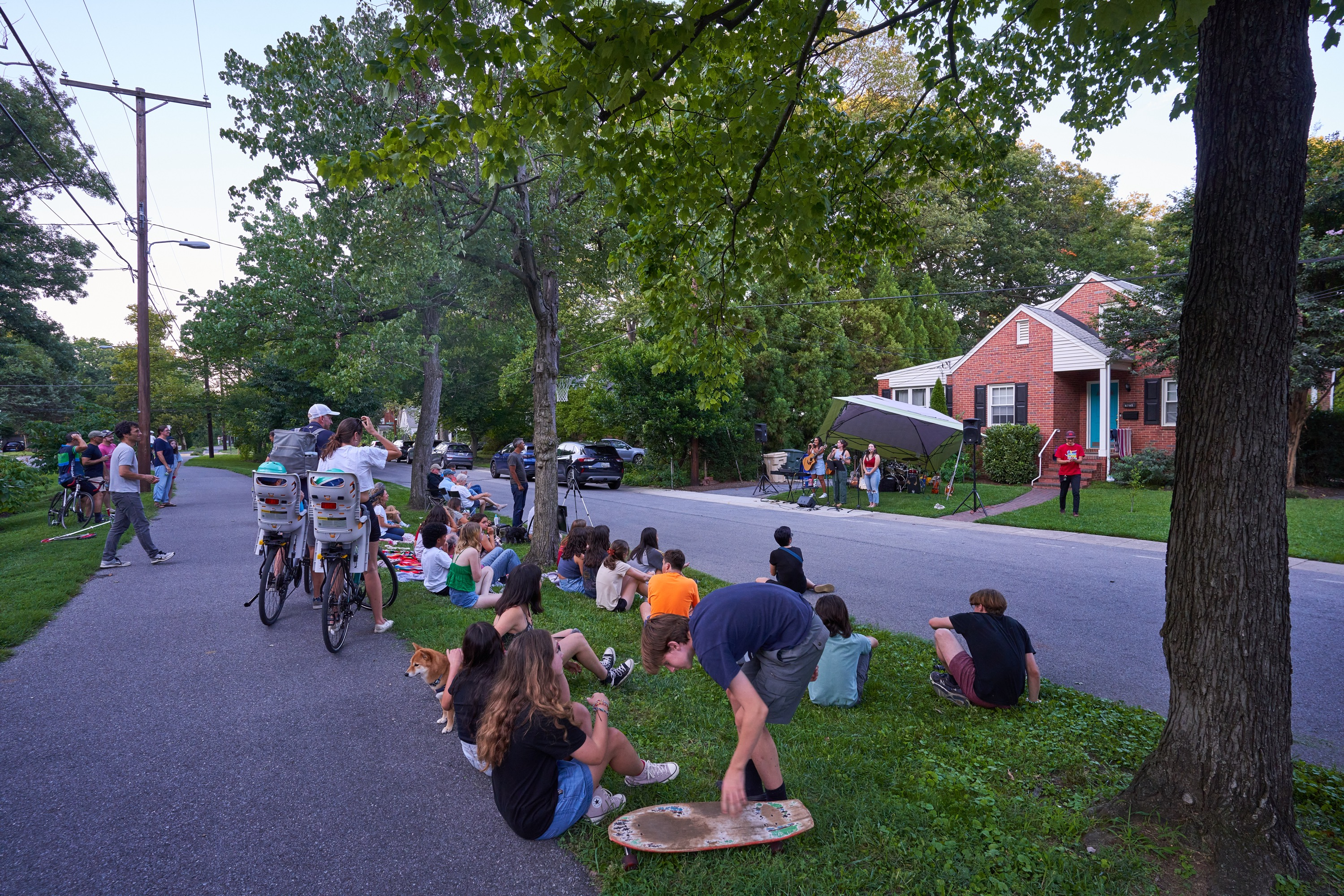
The Trolley trail at the Calvert Hills neighborhood

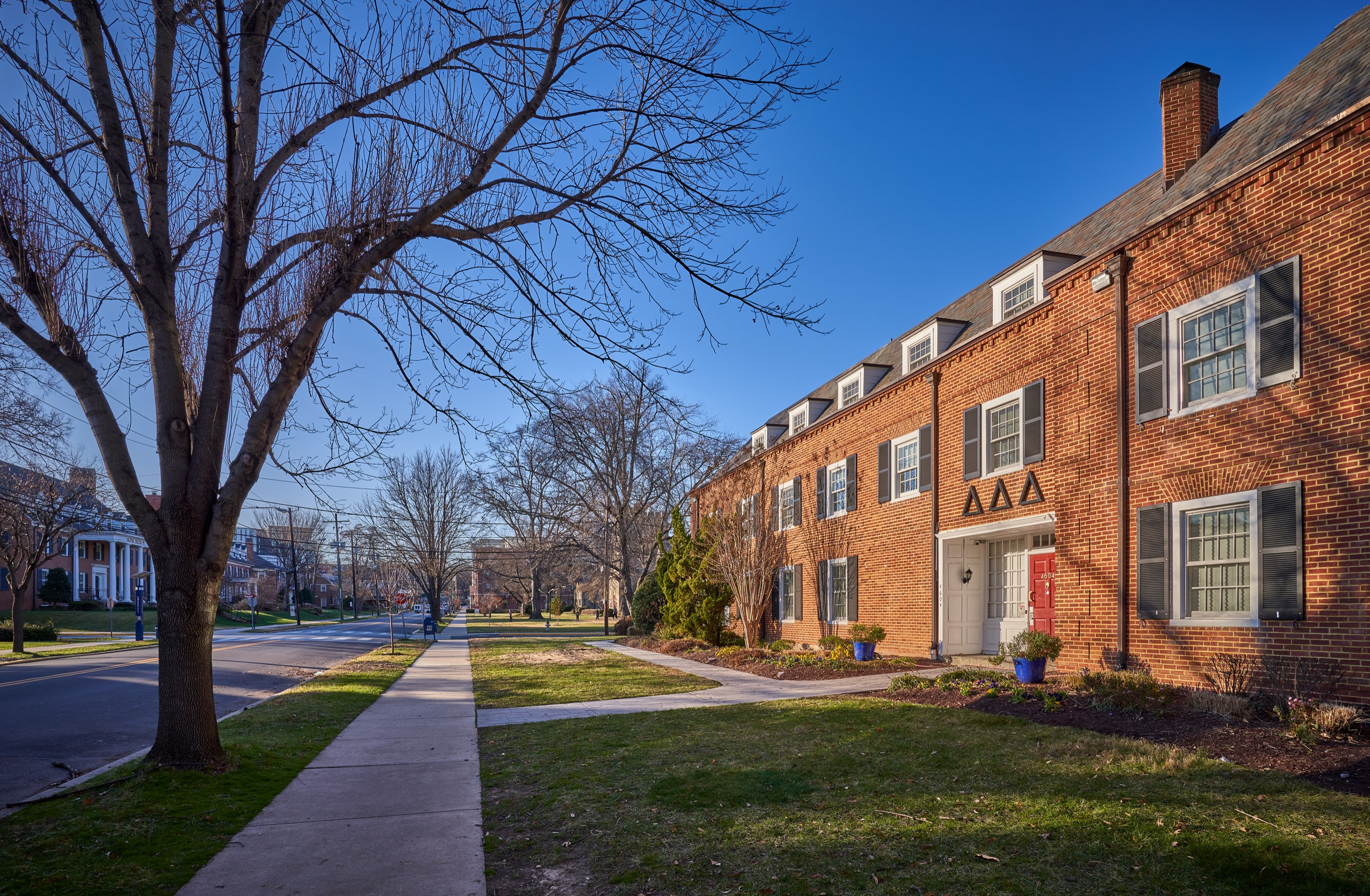
Tri Delta Sorority on College Ave in Old Town

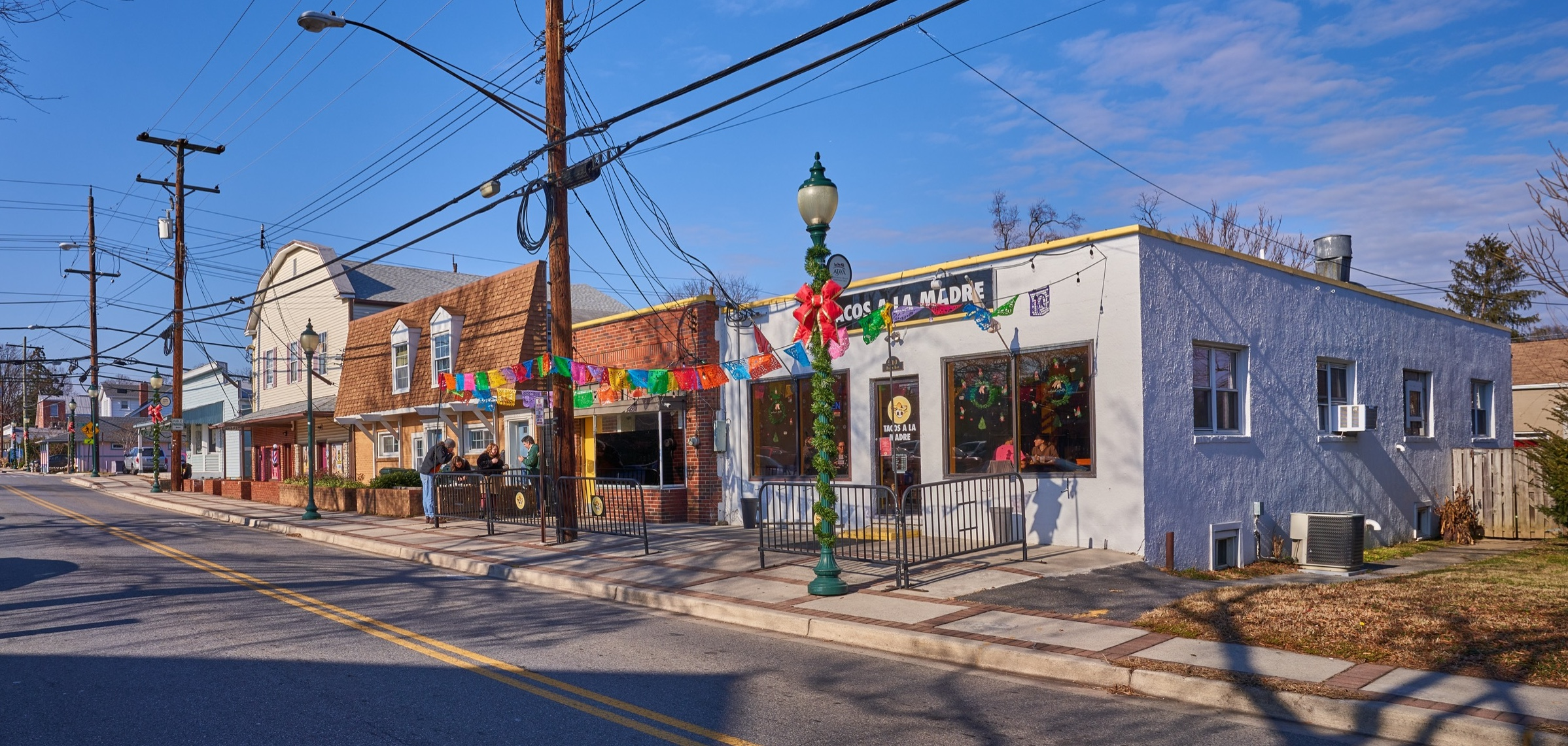
Berwyn Rd. in the Berwyn neighborhood

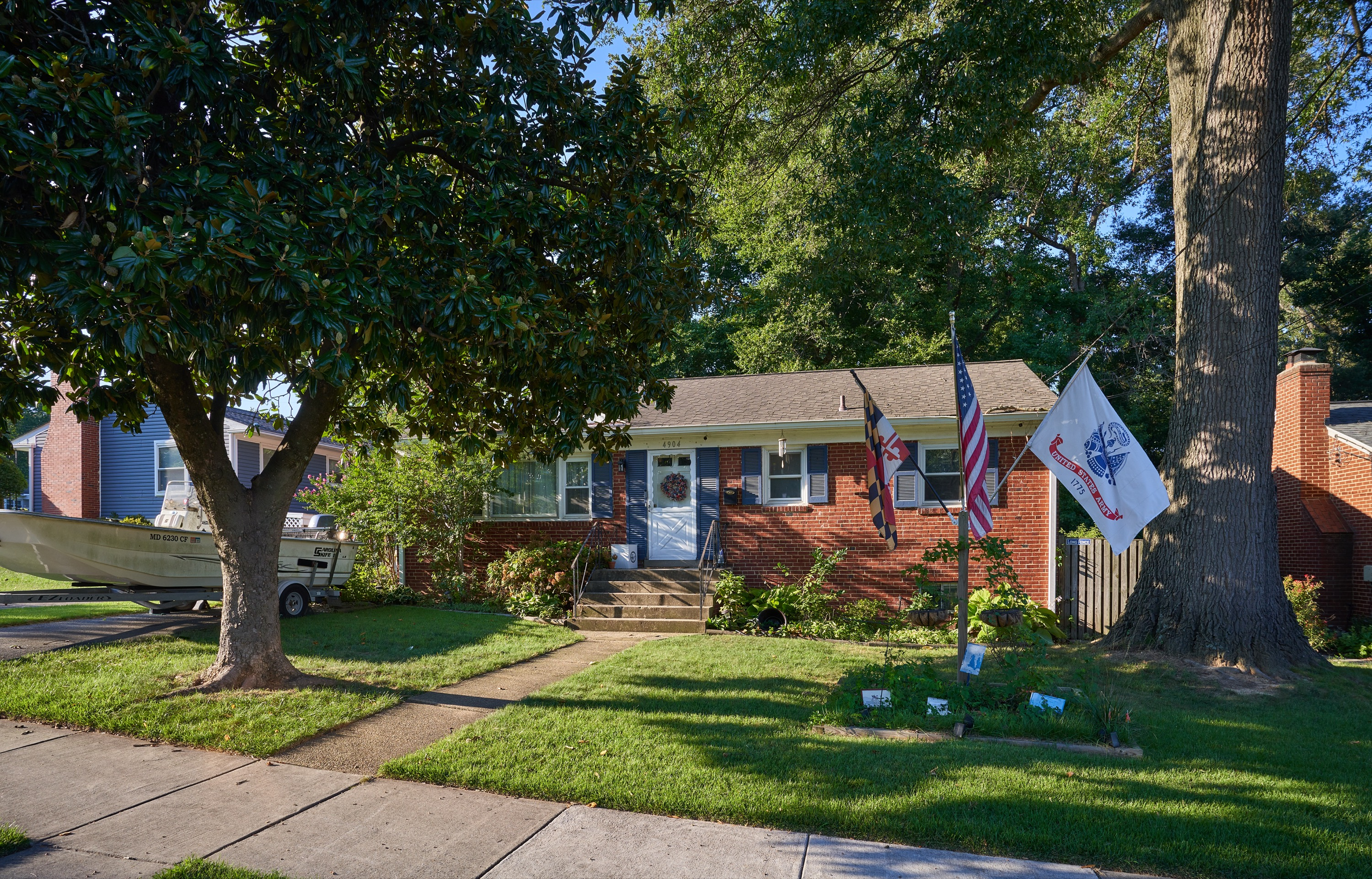
Muskogee St. in the Hollywood neighborhood

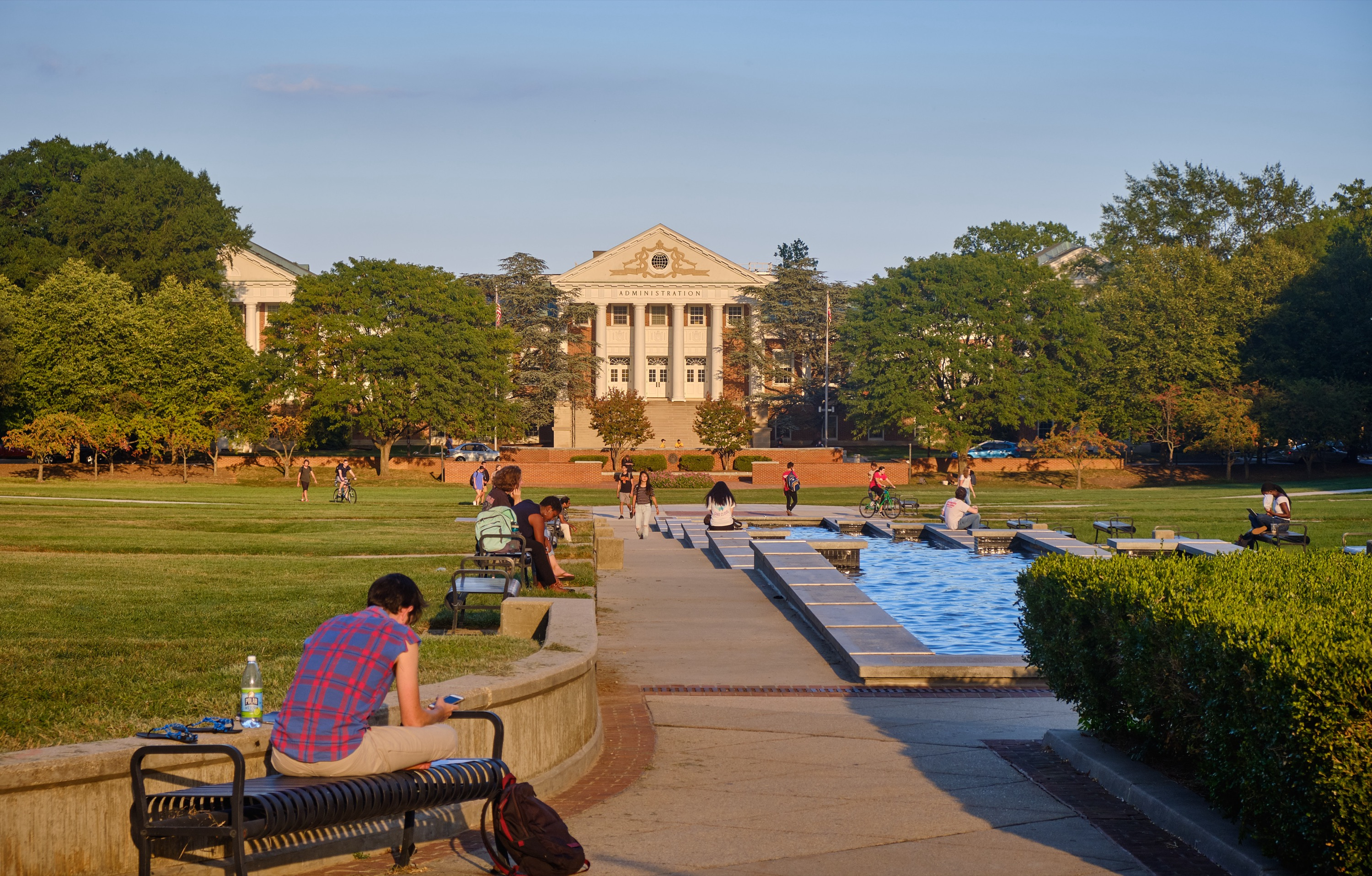
McKeldin Mall at the University of Maryland

Additionally, the campus of the University of Maryland occupies 41% of the city's surface. The main campus, located west of Baltimore Avenue, is noted for its red-brick Georgian buildings and McKeldin Mall, which is the largest academic mall in the United States. Various film and TV pieces have been filmed on this campus, including St. Elmo’s Fire, Veep, National Treasure: Book of Secrets, or Young Sheldon. Graduate as well as fraternity and sorority housing is located between Baltimore Avenue and the CSX tracks, while the Discovery District, the university's business and research park, lies east of the tracks.

=== Climate ===
The climate in this area is characterized by hot, humid summers and generally mild to cool winters. According to the Köppen climate classification system, College Park has a humid subtropical climate, abbreviated "Cfa" on climate maps.

Climate data for College Park, Maryland, 1981–2010 normals, extremes 1894–1996
| Month | Jan | Feb | Mar | Apr | May | Jun | Jul | Aug | Sep | Oct | Nov | Dec | Year |
|---|---|---|---|---|---|---|---|---|---|---|---|---|---|
| Record high °F (°C) | 79 (26) | 84 (29) | 92 (33) | 97 (36) | 103 (39) | 102 (39) | 107 (42) | 106 (41) | 106 (41) | 96 (36) | 86 (30) | 77 (25) | 107 (42) |
| Mean daily maximum °F (°C) | 43.4 (6.3) | 47.4 (8.6) | 55.5 (13.1) | 67.0 (19.4) | 76.4 (24.7) | 84.8 (29.3) | 88.7 (31.5) | 87.4 (30.8) | 80.4 (26.9) | 69.1 (20.6) | 58.7 (14.8) | 46.9 (8.3) | 67.1 (19.5) |
| Daily mean °F (°C) | 34.8 (1.6) | 37.9 (3.3) | 45.2 (7.3) | 55.8 (13.2) | 65.3 (18.5) | 74.4 (23.6) | 79.0 (26.1) | 77.2 (25.1) | 70.0 (21.1) | 58.1 (14.5) | 48.3 (9.1) | 38.5 (3.6) | 57.0 (13.9) |
| Mean daily minimum °F (°C) | 26.2 (−3.2) | 28.5 (−1.9) | 35.0 (1.7) | 44.5 (6.9) | 54.2 (12.3) | 64.1 (17.8) | 69.4 (20.8) | 66.9 (19.4) | 59.6 (15.3) | 47.0 (8.3) | 38.0 (3.3) | 30.2 (−1.0) | 47.0 (8.3) |
| Record low °F (°C) | −26 (−32) | −14 (−26) | −1 (−18) | 11 (−12) | 26 (−3) | 35 (2) | 42 (6) | 41 (5) | 30 (−1) | 20 (−7) | 3 (−16) | −12 (−24) | −26 (−32) |
| Average precipitation inches (mm) | 2.96 (75) | 2.91 (74) | 3.49 (89) | 3.29 (84) | 4.40 (112) | 3.81 (97) | 4.85 (123) | 3.56 (90) | 4.00 (102) | 3.50 (89) | 3.51 (89) | 3.45 (88) | 43.73 (1,112) |
| Average precipitation days (≥ 0.01 in) | 9.4 | 9.0 | 8.9 | 8.8 | 10.5 | 8.2 | 9.5 | 9.0 | 7.9 | 7.7 | 8.0 | 9.4 | 106.3 |
| Average dew point °F (°C) | 24.6 (−4.1) | 25.3 (−3.7) | 31.1 (−0.5) | 41.0 (5.0) | 53.1 (11.7) | 62.2 (16.8) | 66.6 (19.2) | 65.7 (18.7) | 60.1 (15.6) | 48.6 (9.2) | 36.3 (2.4) | 29.5 (−1.4) | 45.3 (7.4) |
Source: NOAAPRISM Climate Group (dew point 1991–2020)

Tornadoes are rare (the whole state of Maryland averages 4 tornadoes per year), but on September 24, 2001, a multiple-vortex F3 tornado hit the area, causing two deaths and 55 injuries and $101 million in property damage. This tornado was part of the Maryland, Virginia, and Washington, D.C., tornado outbreak of 2001, one of the most dramatic recent tornado events to directly affect the Baltimore-Washington metropolitan area.

== Demographics ==
Historical population
| Census | Pop. | Note | %± |
|---|---|---|---|
| 1950 | 11,170 | | — |
| 1960 | 18,482 | | 65.5% |
| 1970 | 26,156 | | 41.5% |
| 1980 | 23,614 | | −9.7% |
| 1990 | 21,927 | | −7.1% |
| 2000 | 24,657 | | 12.5% |
| 2010 | 30,413 | | 23.3% |
| 2020 | 34,740 | | 14.2% |
U.S. Decennial Census

The median income for a household in the city was $50,168, and the median income for a family was $62,759 (these figures had risen to $66,953 and $82,295 respectively as of a 2007 estimate). Males had a median income of $40,445 versus $31,631 for females. The per capita income for the city was $16,026. About 4.2% of families and 19.9% of the population were below the poverty line, including 6.9% of those under age 18 and 9.2% of those age 65 or over.

=== Racial and ethnic composition ===
College Park city, Maryland – Racial and ethnic composition Note: the US Census treats Hispanic/Latino as an ethnic category. This table excludes Latinos from the racial categories and assigns them to a separate category. Hispanics/Latinos may be of any race.
| Race / Ethnicity (NH = Non-Hispanic) | Pop 2000 | Pop 2010 | Pop 2020 | % 2000 | % 2010 | % 2020 |
|---|---|---|---|---|---|---|
| White alone (NH) | 16,399 | 17,691 | 16,602 | 66.51% | 58.17% | 47.79% |
| Black or African American alone (NH) | 3,881 | 4,188 | 5,071 | 15.74% | 13.77% | 14.60% |
| Native American or Alaska Native alone (NH) | 69 | 50 | 57 | 0.28% | 0.16% | 0.16% |
| Asian alone (NH) | 2,455 | 3,853 | 5,952 | 9.96% | 12.67% | 17.13% |
| Native Hawaiian or Pacific Islander alone (NH) | 2 | 18 | 4 | 0.01% | 0.06% | 0.01% |
| Other race alone (NH) | 46 | 178 | 191 | 0.19% | 0.59% | 0.55% |
| Mixed race or Multiracial (NH) | 439 | 814 | 1,534 | 1.78% | 2.68% | 4.42% |
| Hispanic or Latino (any race) | 1,366 | 3,621 | 5,329 | 5.54% | 11.91% | 15.34% |
| Total | 24,657 | 30,413 | 34,740 | 100.00% | 100.00% | 100.00% |

=== 2020 census ===
As of the 2020 census, College Park had a population of 34,740. The median age was 21.7 years. 8.3% of residents were under the age of 18 and 5.8% of residents were 65 years of age or older. For every 100 females there were 110.8 males, and for every 100 females age 18 and over there were 110.4 males age 18 and over.

100.0% of residents lived in urban areas, while 0.0% lived in rural areas.

There were 9,606 households in College Park, of which 17.0% had children under the age of 18 living in them. Of all households, 22.7% were married-couple households, 38.2% were households with a male householder and no spouse or partner present, and 34.5% were households with a female householder and no spouse or partner present. About 38.1% of all households were made up of individuals and 5.8% had someone living alone who was 65 years of age or older.

There were 11,539 housing units, of which 16.8% were vacant. The homeowner vacancy rate was 1.6% and the rental vacancy rate was 7.6%.

Racial composition as of the 2020 census
| Race | Number | Percent |
|---|---|---|
| White | 17,453 | 50.2% |
| Black or African American | 5,167 | 14.9% |
| American Indian and Alaska Native | 177 | 0.5% |
| Asian | 5,974 | 17.2% |
| Native Hawaiian and Other Pacific Islander | 15 | 0.0% |
| Some other race | 3,087 | 8.9% |
| Two or more races | 2,867 | 8.3% |

=== 2010 census ===
As of the census of 2010, there were 30,413 people, 6,757 households, and 2,852 families residing in the city. The population density was 5,392.4 inhabitants per square mile (2,082.0/km^{2}). There were 8,212 housing units at an average density of 1,456.0 units per square mile (562.2 units/km^{2}). The racial makeup of the city was 63.0% White, 14.3% African American, 0.3% Native American, 12.7% Asian, 0.1% Pacific Islander, 6.0% from other races, and 3.5% from two or more races. Hispanic or Latino residents of any race were 11.9% of the population.

There were 6,757 households, of which 18.4% had children under the age of 18 living with them, 30.6% were married couples living together, 7.9% had a female householder with no husband present, 3.7% had a male householder with no wife present, and 57.8% were non-families. 24.8% of all households were made up of individuals, and 6.6% had someone living alone who was 65 years of age or older. The average household size was 2.79 and the average family size was 3.18.

The median age in the city was 21.3 years. 7.6% of residents were under the age of 18; 60.7% were between the ages of 18 and 24; 15.7% were from 25 to 44; 11% were from 45 to 64; and 5.1% were 65 years of age or older. The gender makeup of the city was 53.1% male and 46.9% female.

=== 2000 census ===
As of the census of 2000, there were 24,657 people, 6,030 households, and 3,039 families residing in the city. The population density was 4,537.5 inhabitants per square mile (1,751.9/km^{2}). There were 6,245 housing units at an average density of 1,149.2 units per square mile (443.7 units/km^{2}). The racial makeup of the city was 68.82% White, 15.93% Black or African American, 0.33% Native American, 10.03% Asian, 0.01% Pacific Islander, 2.57% from other races, and 2.31% from two or more races. 5.54% of the population were Hispanic or Latino of any race.

There were 6,030 households, out of which 19.8% had children under the age of 18 living with them, 38.6% were married couples living together, 8.3% had a female householder with no husband present, and 49.6% were non-families. 25.7% of all households were made up of individuals, and 9.1% had someone living alone who was 65 years of age or older. The average household size was 2.65 and the average family size was 3.11.

In the city, 10.5% of the population was under the age of 18, 51.3% was between from 18 to 24, 19.8% from 25 to 44, 11.3% from 45 to 64, and 7.2% were 65 years of age or older. The median age was 22 years. For every 100 females, there were 110.3 males. For every 100 females age 18 and over, there were 111.2 males.

== Economy ==
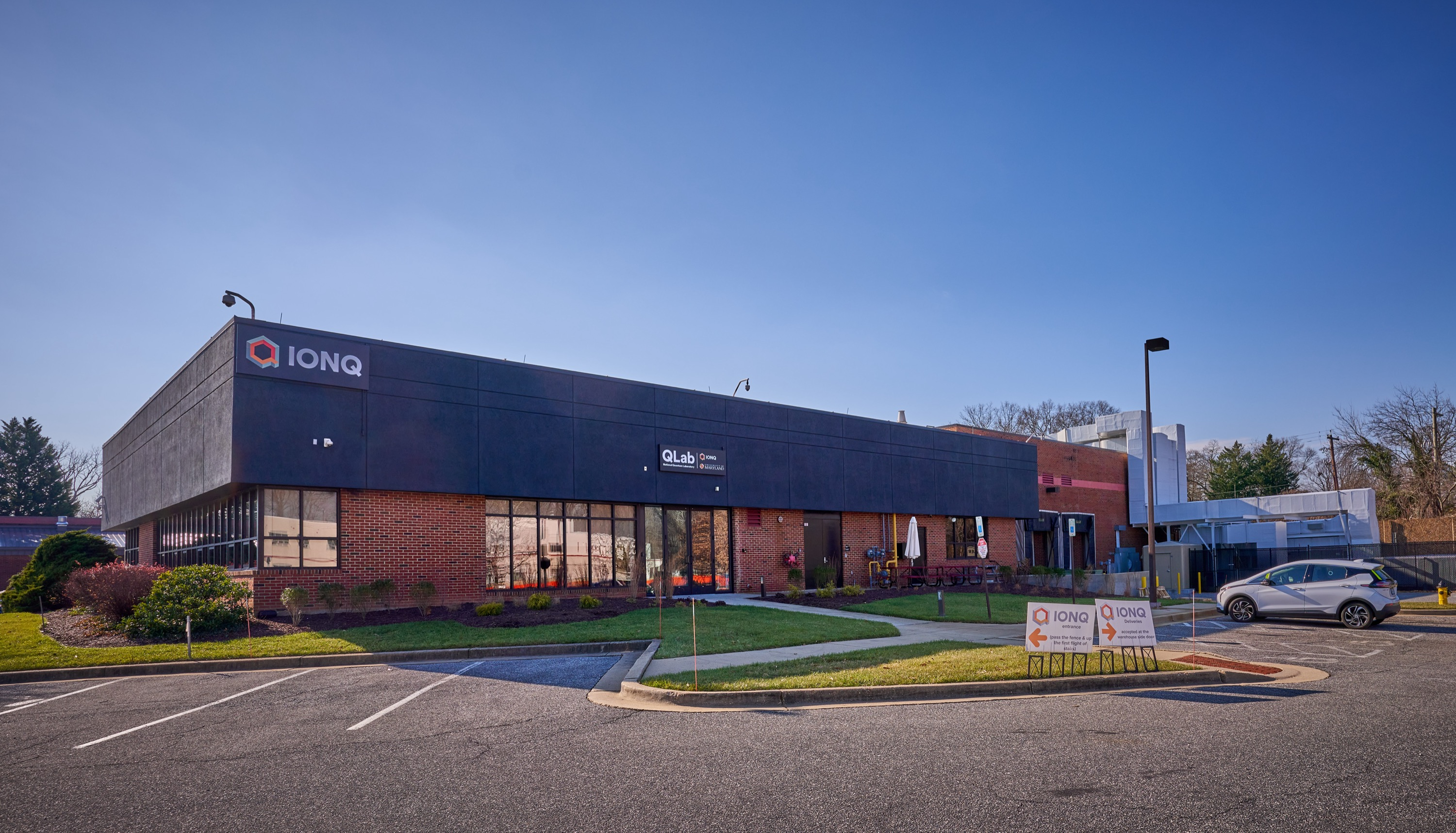
IonQ and Q-Lab headquarters in College Park's Discovery district

The University of Maryland shapes College Park's economy significantly, contributing to over half of the city's total employment and a significant fraction of its population. In 2017 the university rebranded its 150-acre business and research park as the Discovery district aiming to bring together research firms, start-ups and shops and restaurants. This area is divided between College Park and Riverdale Park.

This Discovery district is home to federal agencies such as the NOAA's Weather Prediction Center, the FDA's Center for Food Safety and Applied Nutrition (CFSAN), and the navy's software factory (the Forge), as well as university centers such as the Applied Research Laboratory for Intelligence and Security (ARLIS) sponsored by the Department of Defense.

The Discovery district also includes technology companies generally related to the university. An area that has seen rapid growth in the Discovery district since 2010 is quantum technology. Efforts in this field include IonQ, a quantum computing company with a market capitalization of $2.8 billion as of December 2023, Quantum Startup Foundry, Quantum Catalyzer, and the National Quantum Lab at Maryland (Q-Lab), the nation's first facility providing hands-on access to a commercial-grade quantum computer to the scientific community. These efforts are part of the university's campaign to further establish the area as the capital of quantum.

Other sectors with a strong presence in the Discovery district are cyber security (Cybrary, Immuta, BlueVoyand, and Inky) and medical devices (Medcura). On December 18, 2023, the Washington Commanders announced that they would be moving their headquarters to the Discovery district in 2024. The Discovery district area is considered one of the most important economic drivers in the county.

=== Top employers ===
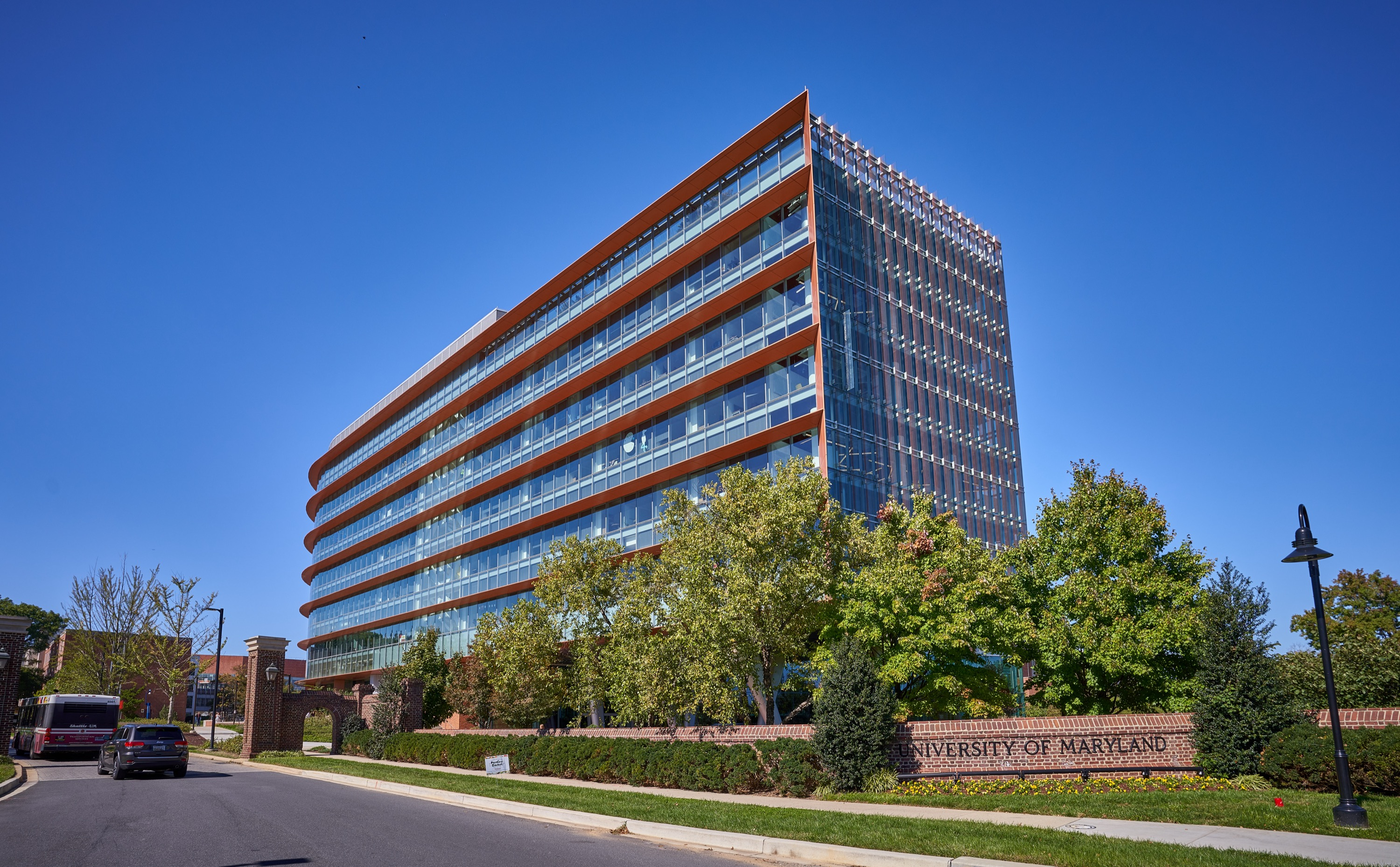
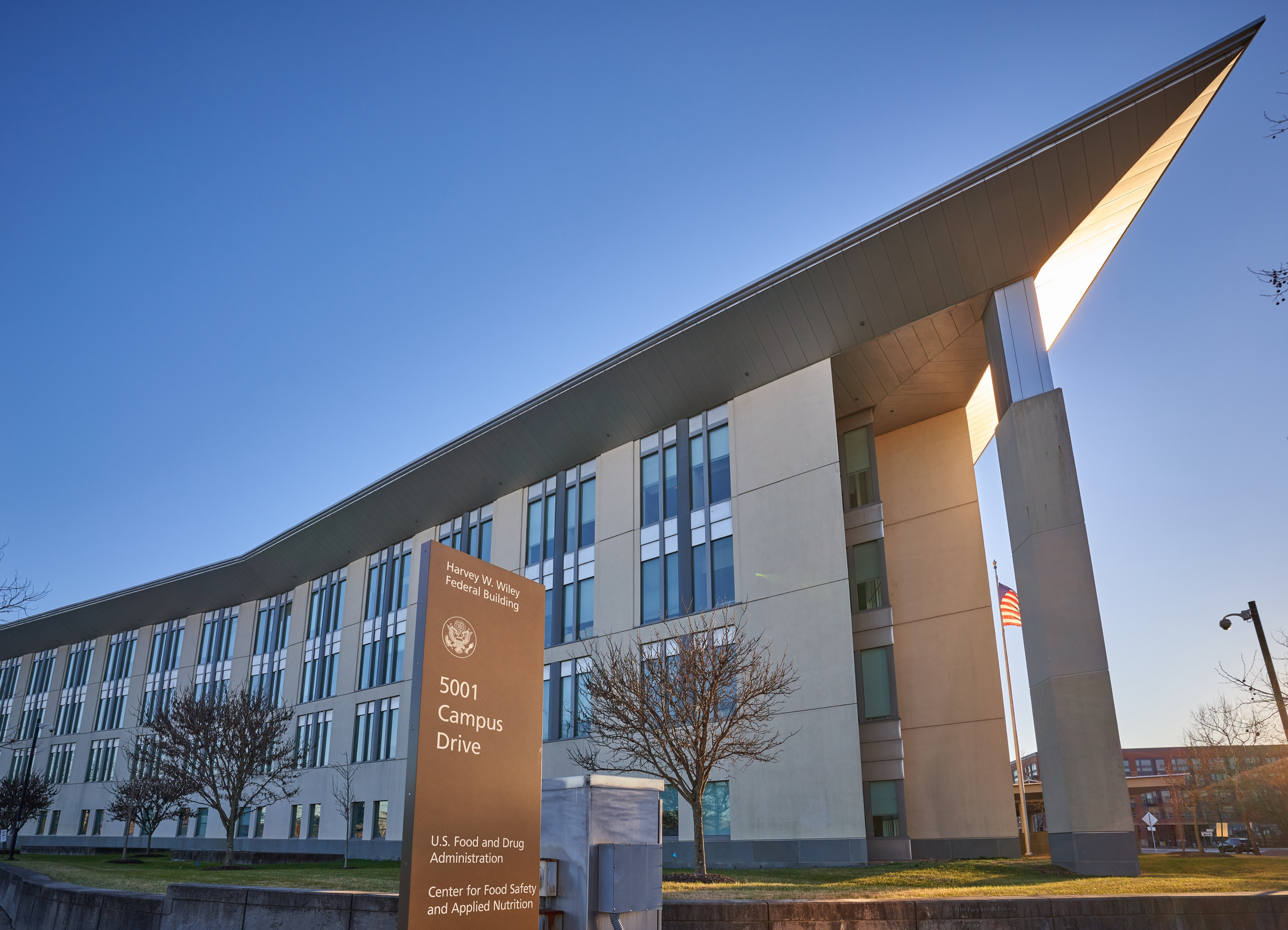
Top: the University of Maryland is the main employer in College Park. Bottom: the FDA CFSAN is the fourth-largest employer.

According to the College Park's 2023 Comprehensive Annual Financial Report, the top employers in the city are:

| # | Employer | Employees | Total city employment |
|---|---|---|---|
| 1 | University of Maryland, College Park | 14,505 | 49.2% |
| 2 | University of Maryland Global Campus | 1,037 | 3.5% |
| 3 | National Oceanic and Atmospheric Administration | 900 | 3.1% |
| 4 | Food and Drug Administration | 755 | 2.6% |
| 5 | National Archives and Records Administration | 732 | 2.5% |
| 6 | IKEA | 500 | 1.7% |
| 7 | IonQ | 200 | 0.7% |
| 8 | The Home Depot | 170 | 0.6% |
| 9 | The hotel at the University of Maryland | 155 | 0.5% |
| 10 | American Center for Physics | 142 | 0.5% |

== Culture ==
The city organizes several annual events. The College Park Day, held in October at the College Park Aviation Museum & Airport, is the city's signature event. It features various activities, entertainment, and food vendors celebrating the community. Other events include the College Park Parade, featuring local groups, organizations, entertainers, and performers, Friday Night Live!, held several Fridays over the summer and featuring a variety of musical genres, food, beer, and other entertainment, and Winter Wonderland, which hosts the annual Winter Wonderland holiday market and the lighting of the city's tree.

During the late spring and throughout the summer, farmer markets in the Hollywood neighborhood, the university campus, and Paint Branch Parkway sell local produce, meats, bakery products, and crafts.

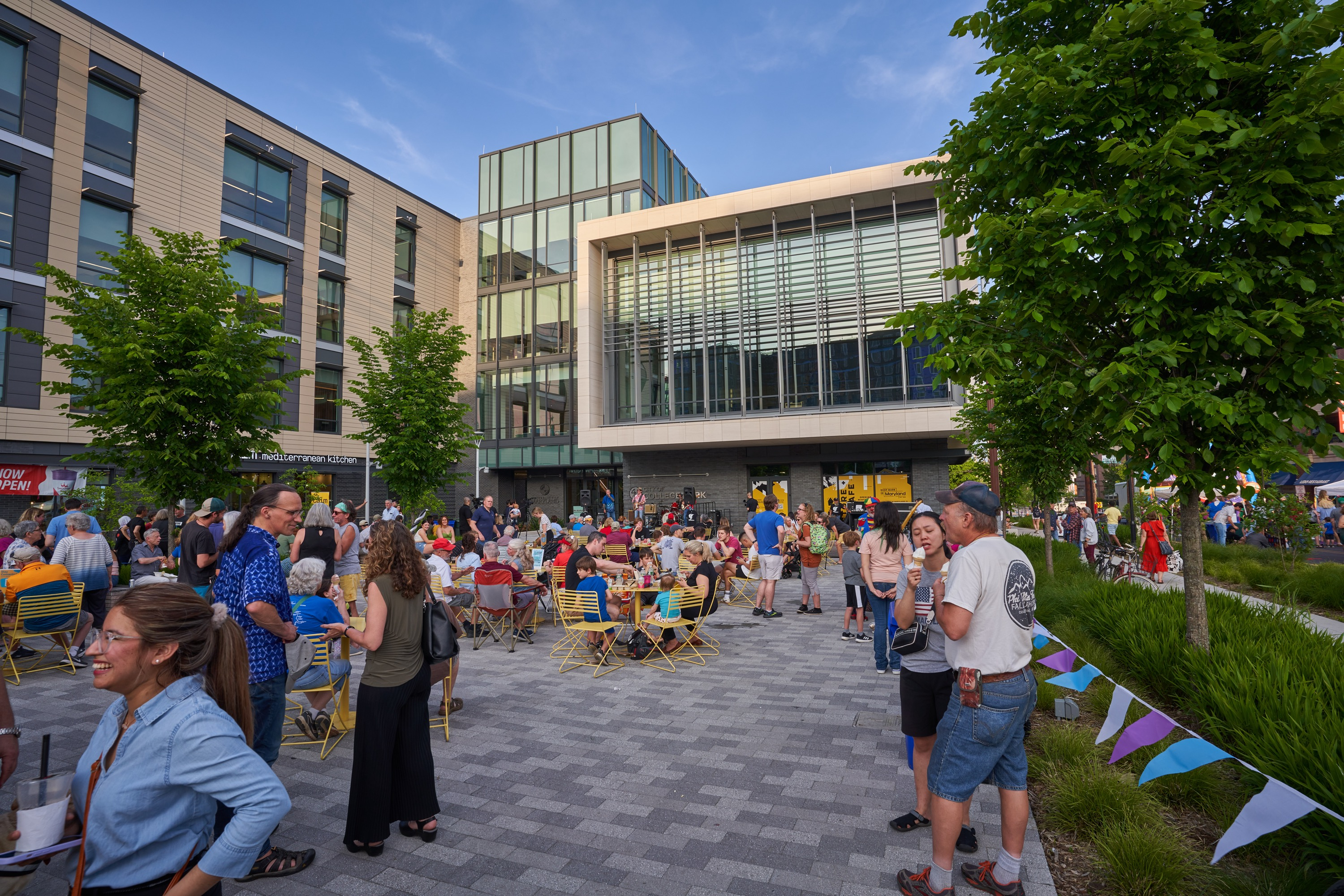
Friday Night Life! at the City Hall plaza

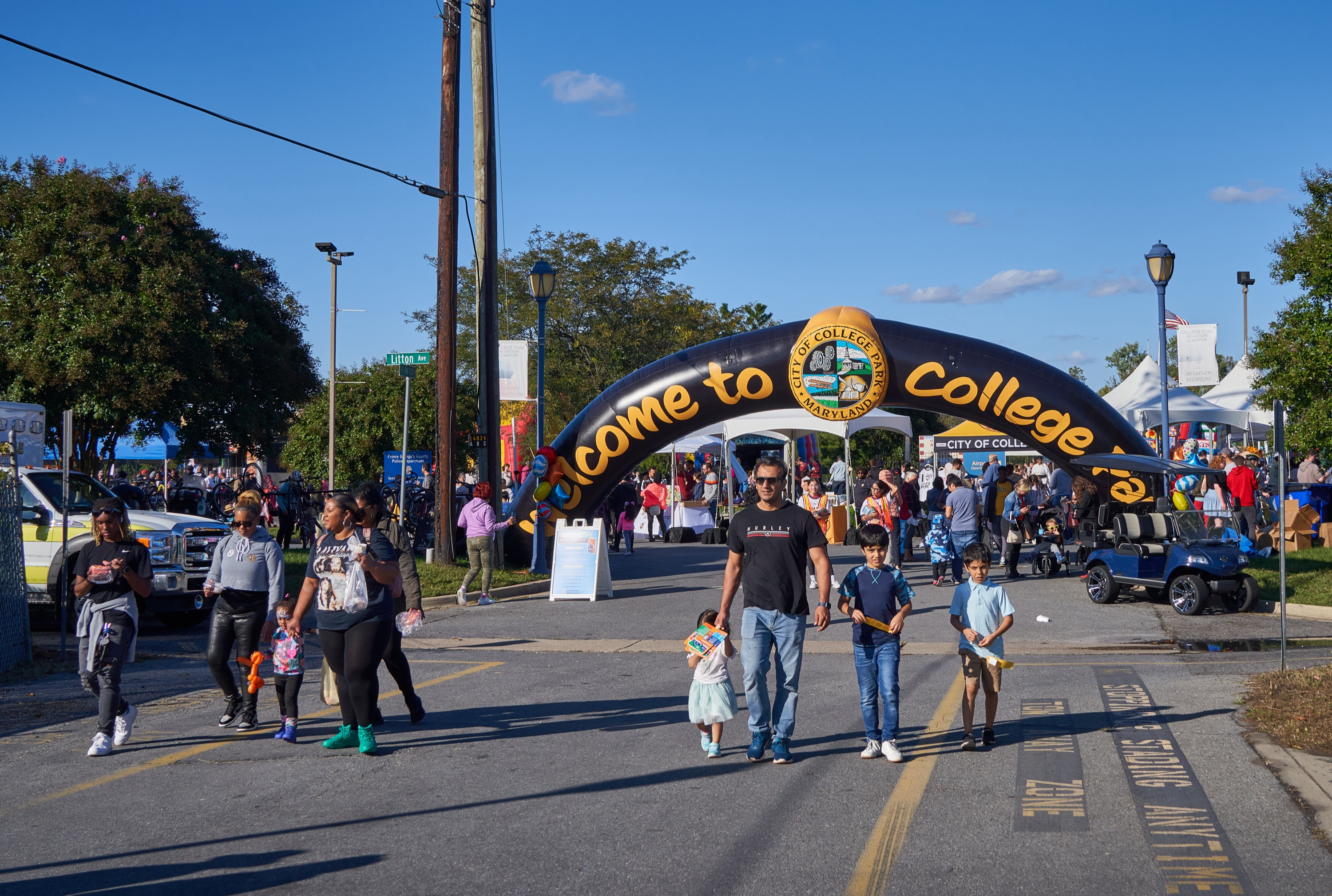
Entrance at the College Park day

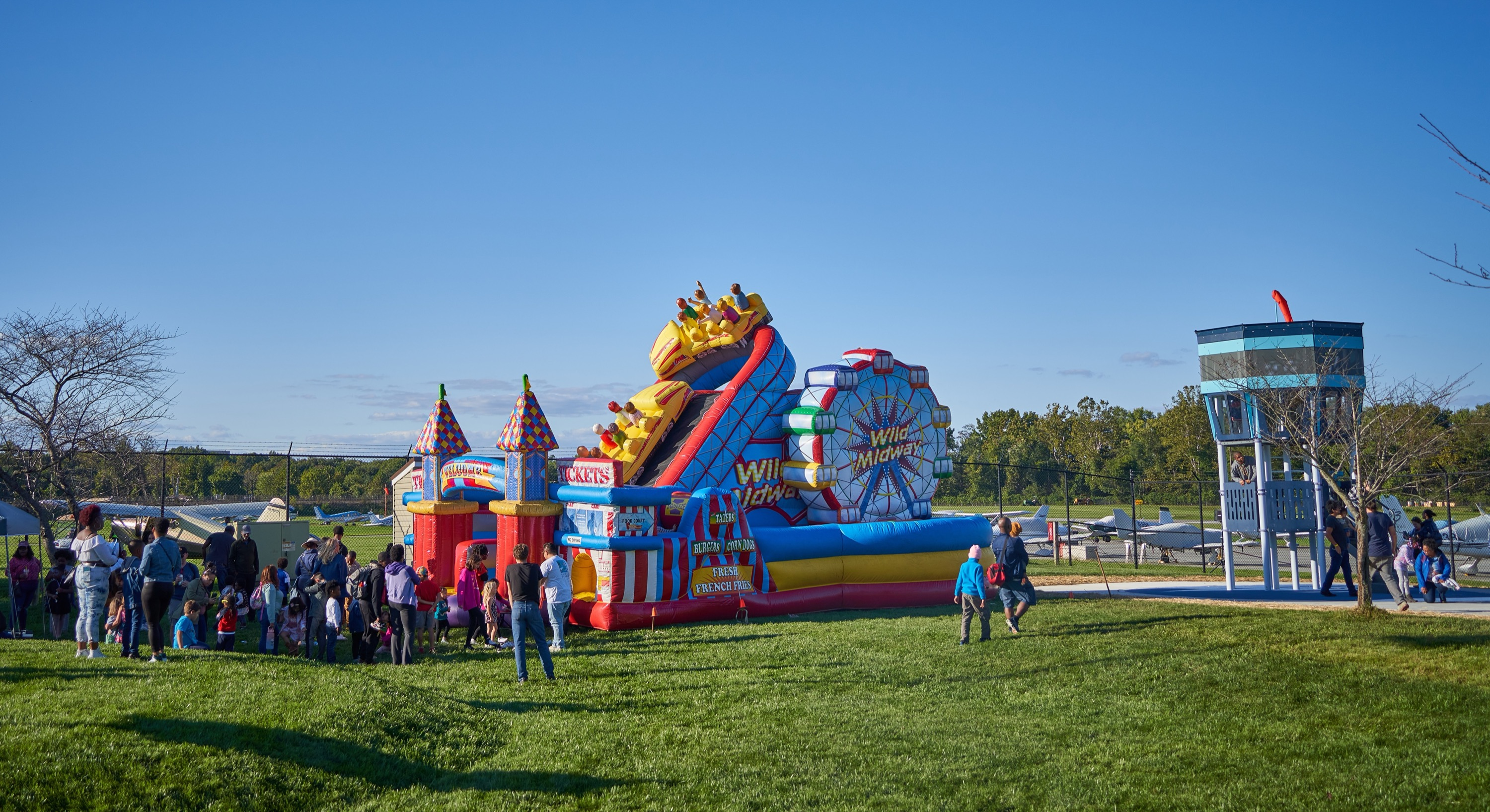
Inflatable at the College Park day with the airport in the background

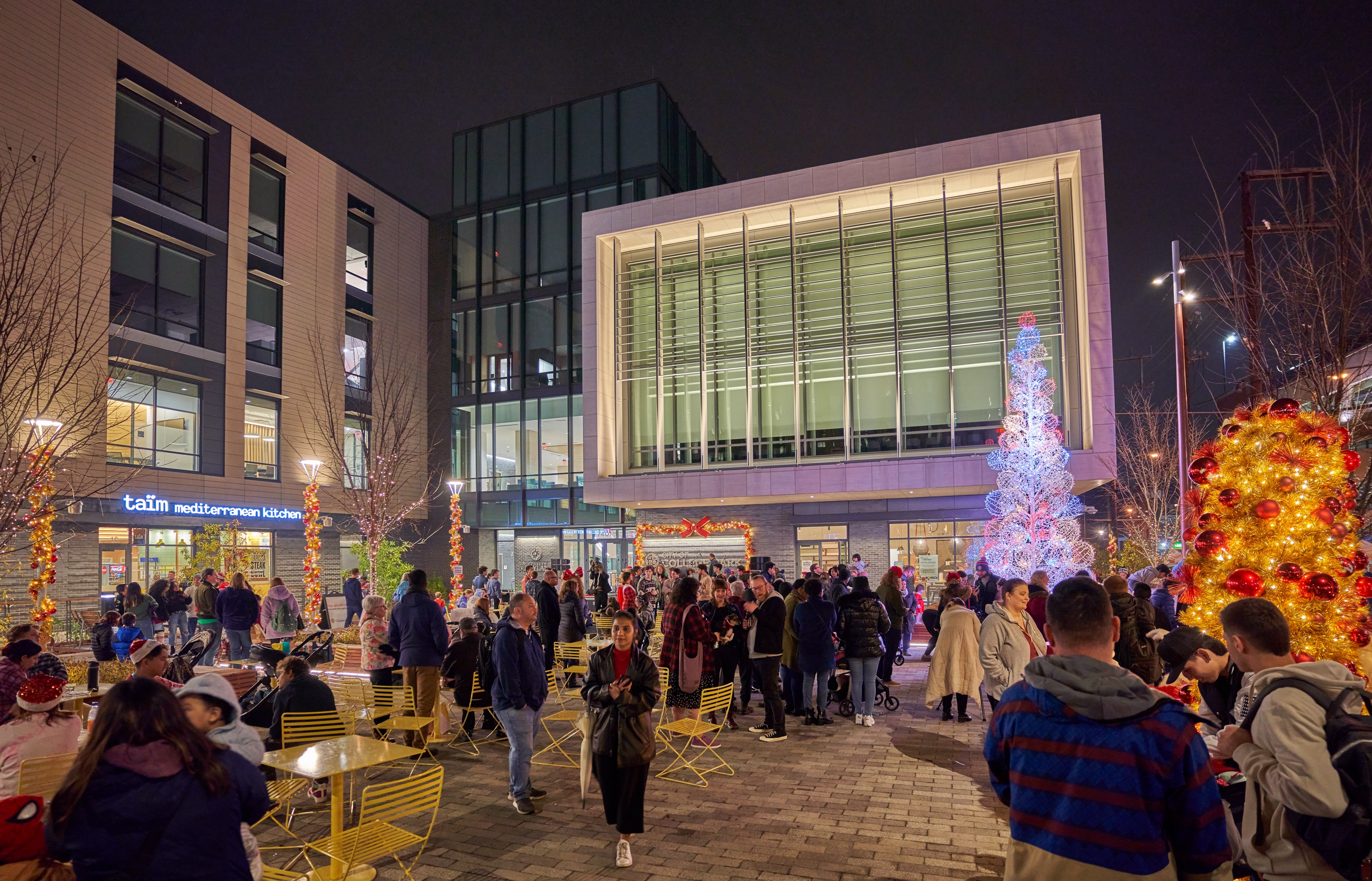
Tree lighting at the Winter Wonderland

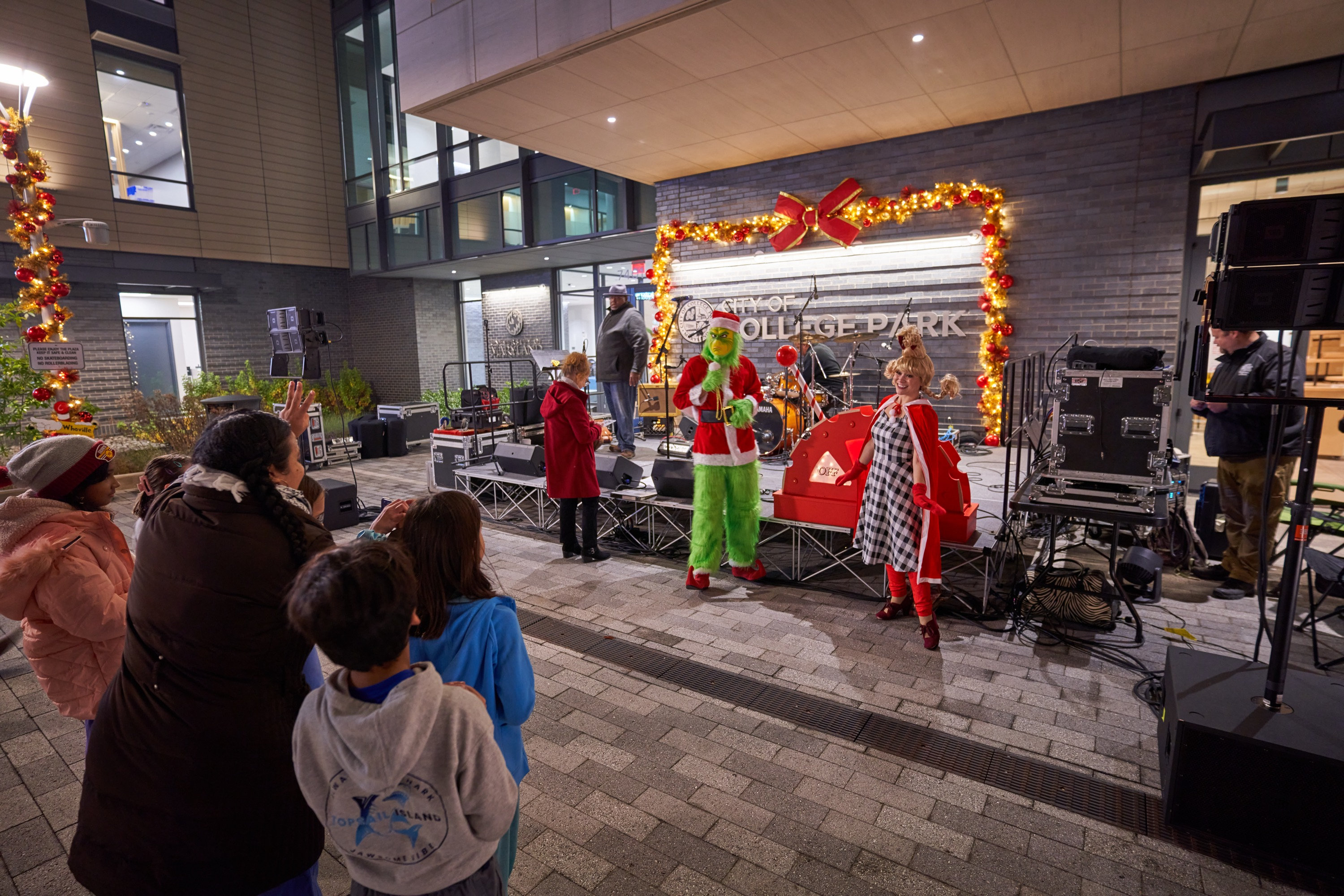
Grinch at the College Park Winter Wonderland

=== Performing arts ===
Several performing arts groups and facilities are on the University of Maryland's campus. The Clarice Smith Performing Arts Center is a 318,000-square-foot complex that opened in 2001 housing six performance venues as well as the Michelle Smith Performing Arts Library. The Adele H. Stamp Student Union houses the Hoff Theater, the Art and Learning Center, and the Grand Ballroom where various events are held. Additionally, the Nyumburu Amphitheater, adjacent to the Stamp Student Union, features outdoor performances. The Jones-Hill House (former Cole Field), the Ritchie Coliseum, and the XFINITY Center are athletic facilities that also host performances. Some notable concerts held in these venues include Bruce Springsteen in 1973, Elvis Presley in 1974, Queen in 1977, and U2 in 1983.

Other venues in College Park that host cultural events include the Old Parish House, owned by the city, and the Hall CP, a restaurant with an outdoor performing area.

=== Museums ===
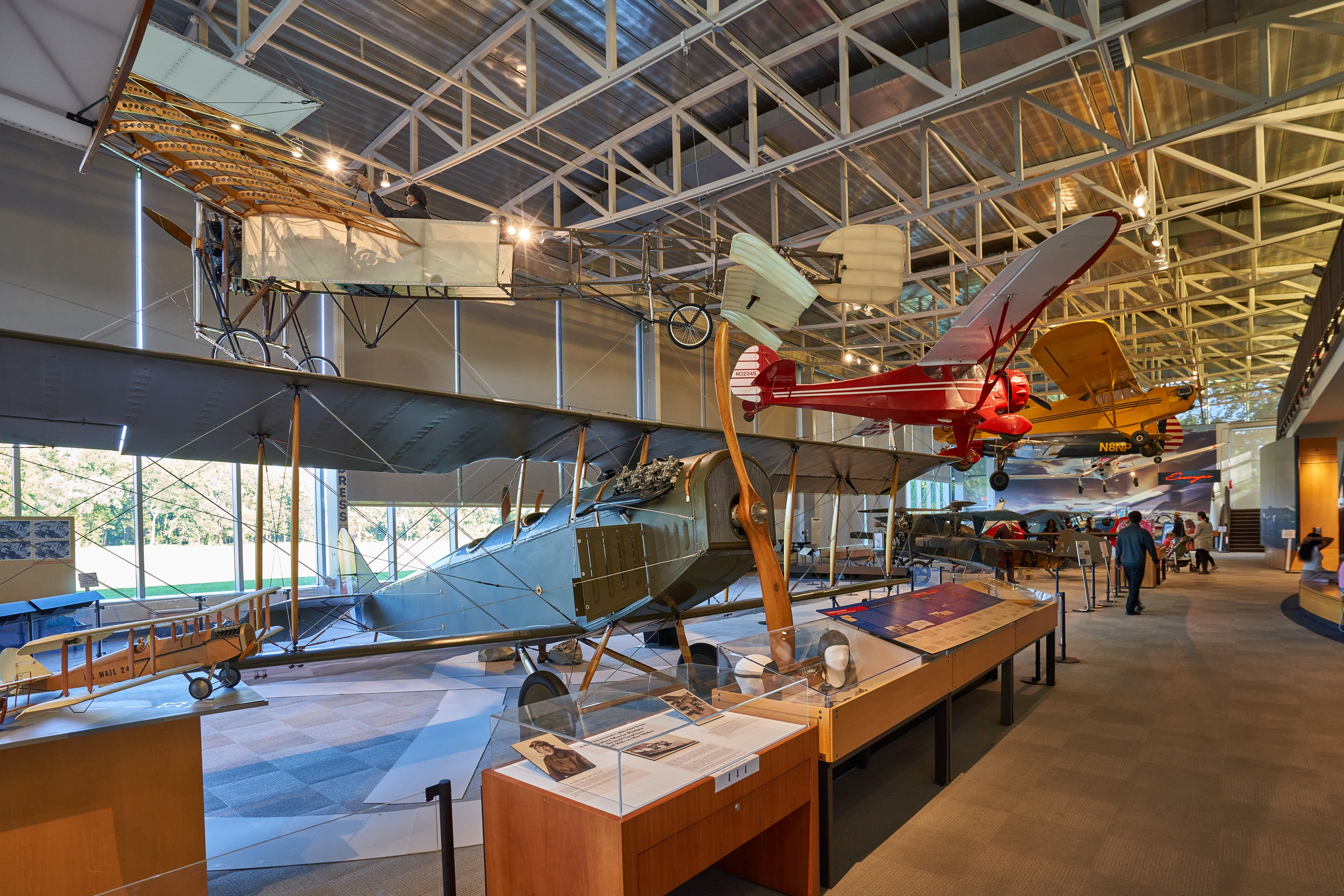
Aircraft on exhibit inside of the Aviation museum

The College Park Aviation Museum is an affiliate of the Smithsonian Institution that since 1987 has housed antique and reproduction aircraft associated with the history of College Park Airport. It also includes an extensive library and archives which hold materials relating to the airport's history, early aviation history, especially relating to Maryland.

Other museums in College Park include the Art Gallery at the University of Maryland, the flagship art museum on the campus of the University of Maryland, and the National Museum of Language, a cultural institution established in 1997 to examine the history, impact, and art of language.

=== Historic sites ===
The following sites and districts in College Park are listed on the National Register of Historic Places:

| Site name | Year | Location | Description |
|---|---|---|---|
| National Archives Archeological Site | 3000–2600 B.C. | 8601 Adelphi Rd. | Archeological remains from prehistoric settlements during the Late Archaic period. |
| Old Town College Park | 1890s | Roughly bounded by Yale, & Columbia Aves., Calvert Rd., & UMD Campus. | Developed to attract commuters to Baltimore and Washington, DC, and individuals affiliated with the Maryland Agricultural College. |
| Calvert Hills Historic District | 1890s | Roughly bounded by Calvert Rd., Bowdoin Ave., Erskine Rd., Calvert Park, Albion Rd., and Baltimore Ave. | Developed in the early part of the 20th century by members of the Calvert family. |
| College Park airport | 1909 | 6709 Corporal Frank S. Scott Dr. | The oldest continuously operated airport in the world. |
| Marenka House | 1958 | 7300 Radcliffe Dr | Distinctive local example of Modern Movement architecture. |

Additionally there are 14 historic sites in College Park as identified by the Maryland-National Capital Park and Planning Commission. The following is a list of the historic sites that predate the 20th century:

| Site name | Year | Location | Description |
|---|---|---|---|
| Rossborough Inn | 1803 | 7682 Baltimore Ave. | Owned by the Calverts of Riversdale, the inn was a popular stage-stop on the Baltimore and Washington Turnpike. |
| Old Parish House | 1817 | 4711 Knox Rd. | Originally constructed as a farm building on the Calverts’ Riversdale estate, later was used as a parish hall and the headquarters of the College Park Woman's Club. |
| Cory House | 1891 | 4710 College Ave. | One of the first houses built in the 1889 subdivision of College Park. |
| Morrill Hall | 1892 | 7313 Preinkert Dr. | Named for Justin Smith Morrill, a Vermont politician who wrote the first Land Grant Act. |
| Taliaferro House | 1893 | 7406 Columbia Ave. | The home of Emily Taliaferro, daughter of John Oliver Johnson who developed the 1889 College Park subdivision. |
| Lake House | 1894 | 8524 Potomac Ave. | Built by and for the family of Wilmot Lake, later served as the parsonage of the Berwyn Presbyterian Church. |
| McDonnell House | 1896 | 7400 Dartmouth Ave. | Built for Henry B. McDonnell, the first Dean of Arts and Sciences of the University of Maryland. |

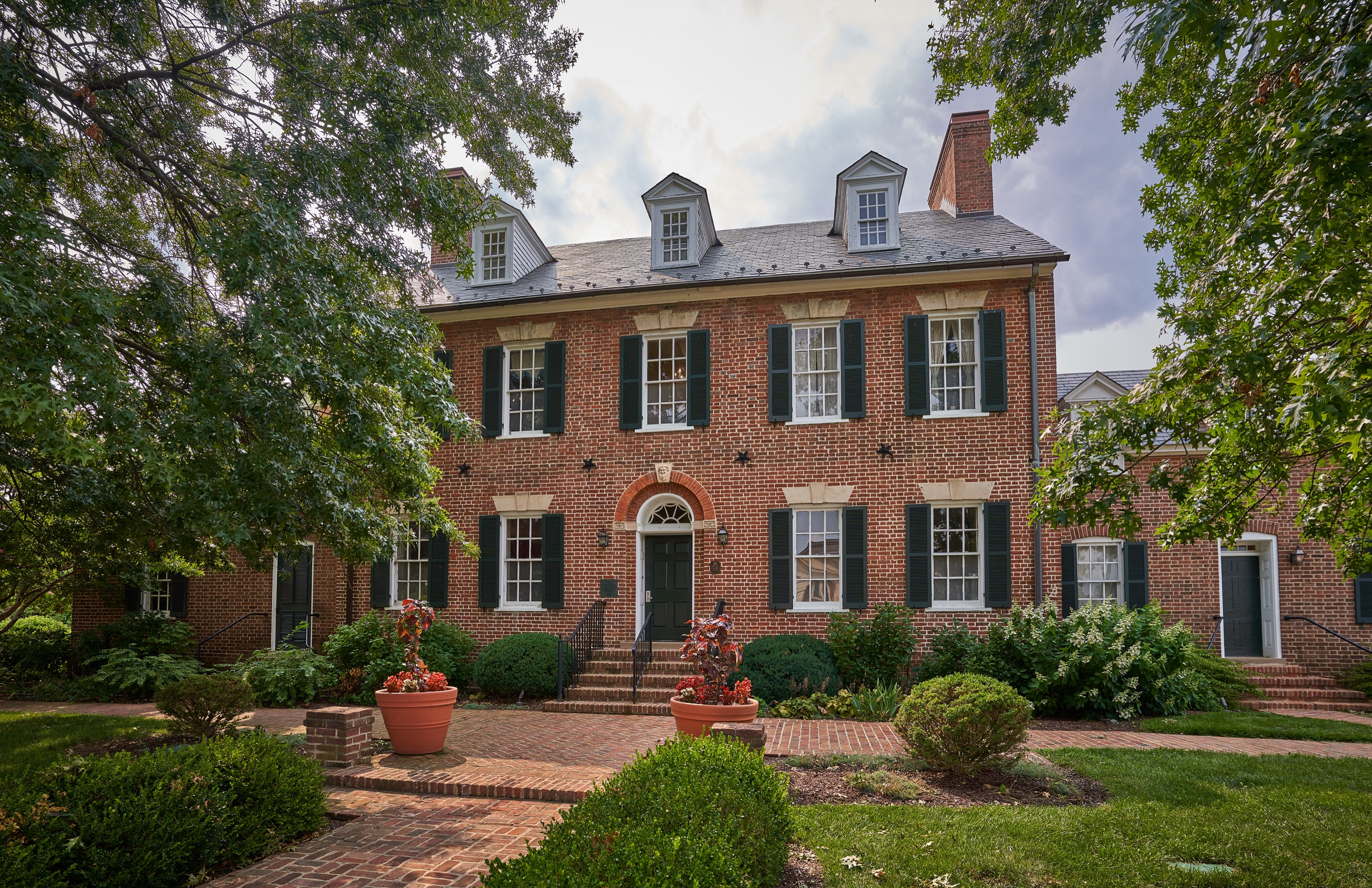
The Rossborough Inn (1803), oldest building in College Park

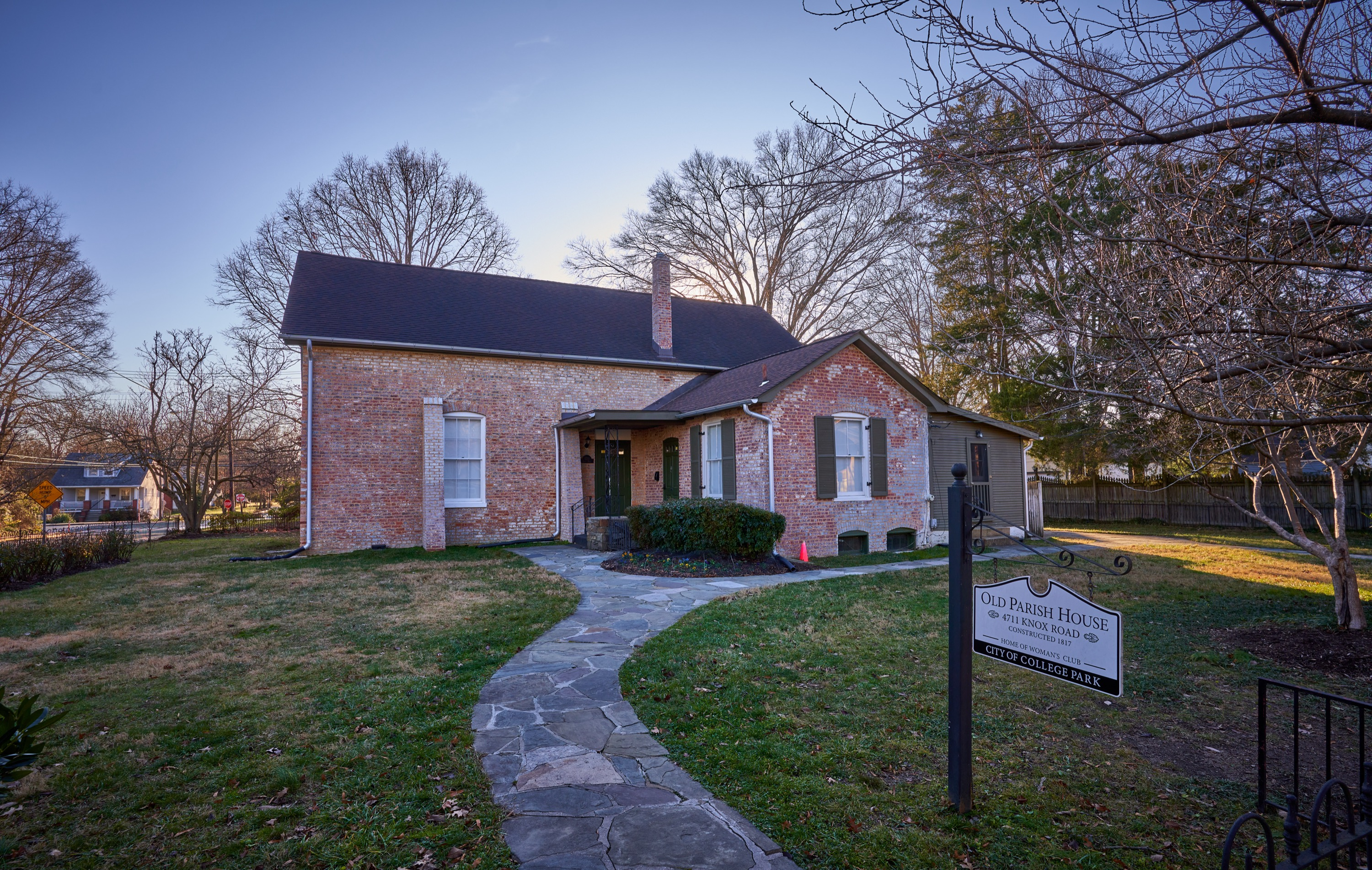
The Old Parish House, built in 1817

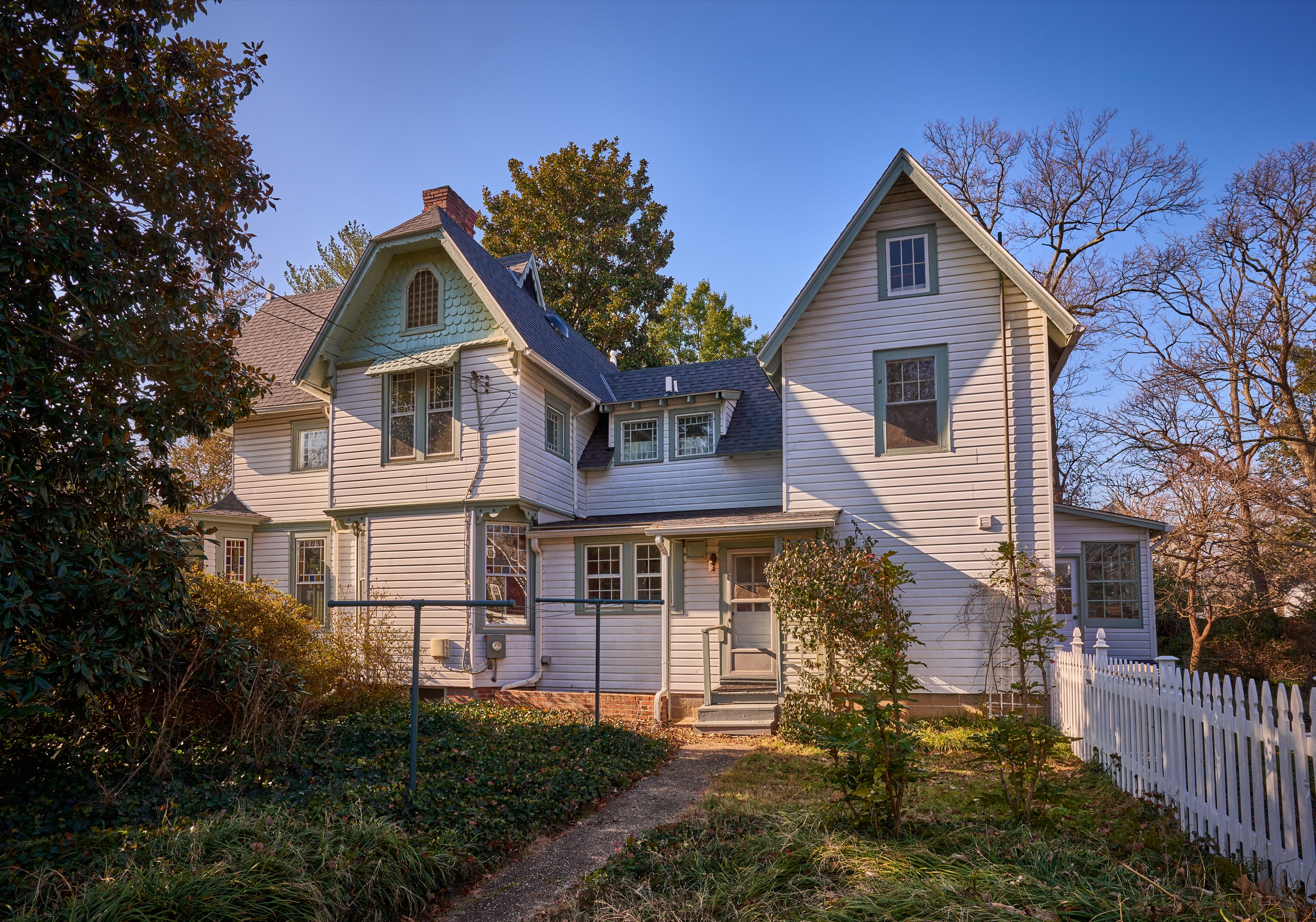
The Cory House, built in 1891

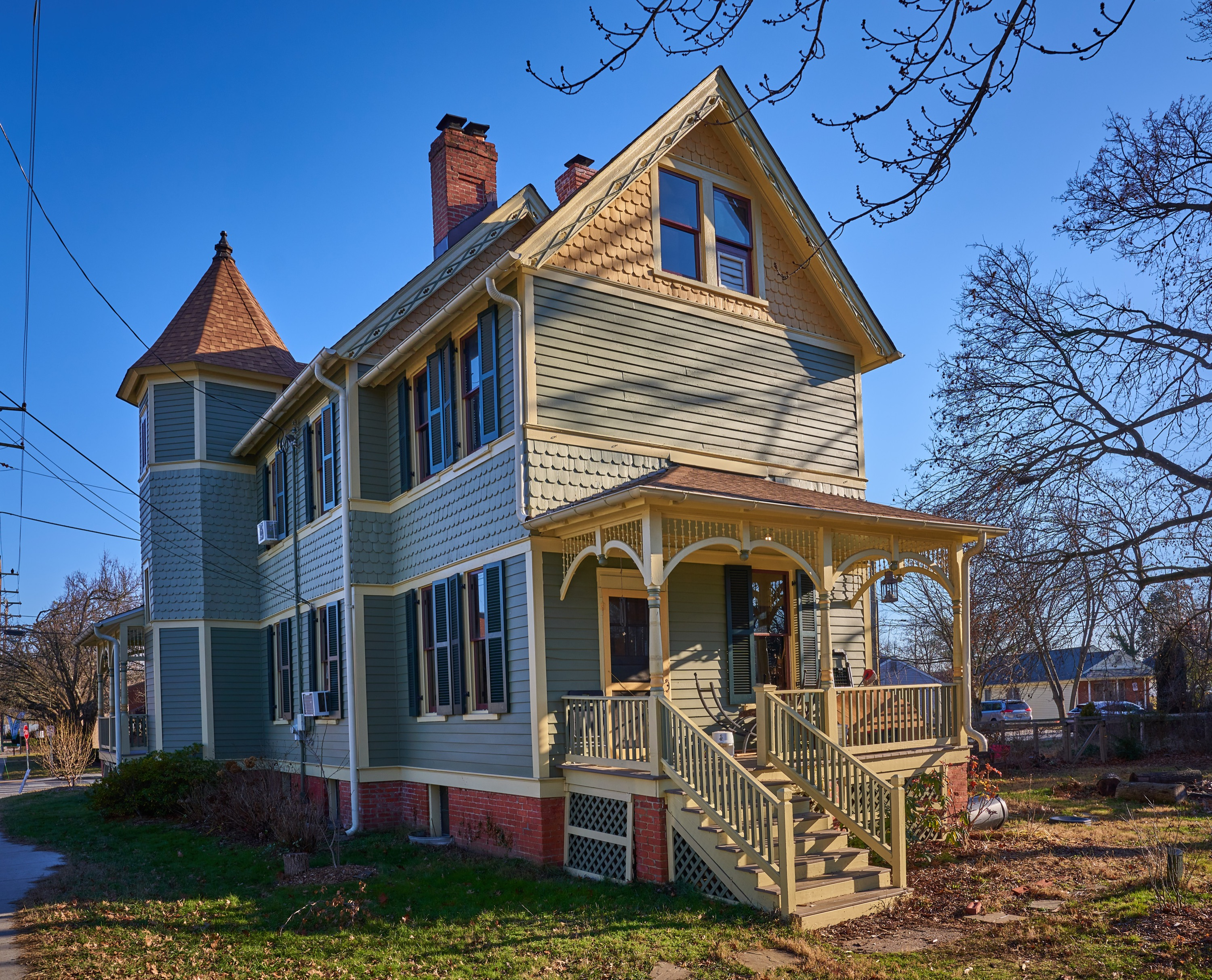
The Lake House, built in 1894

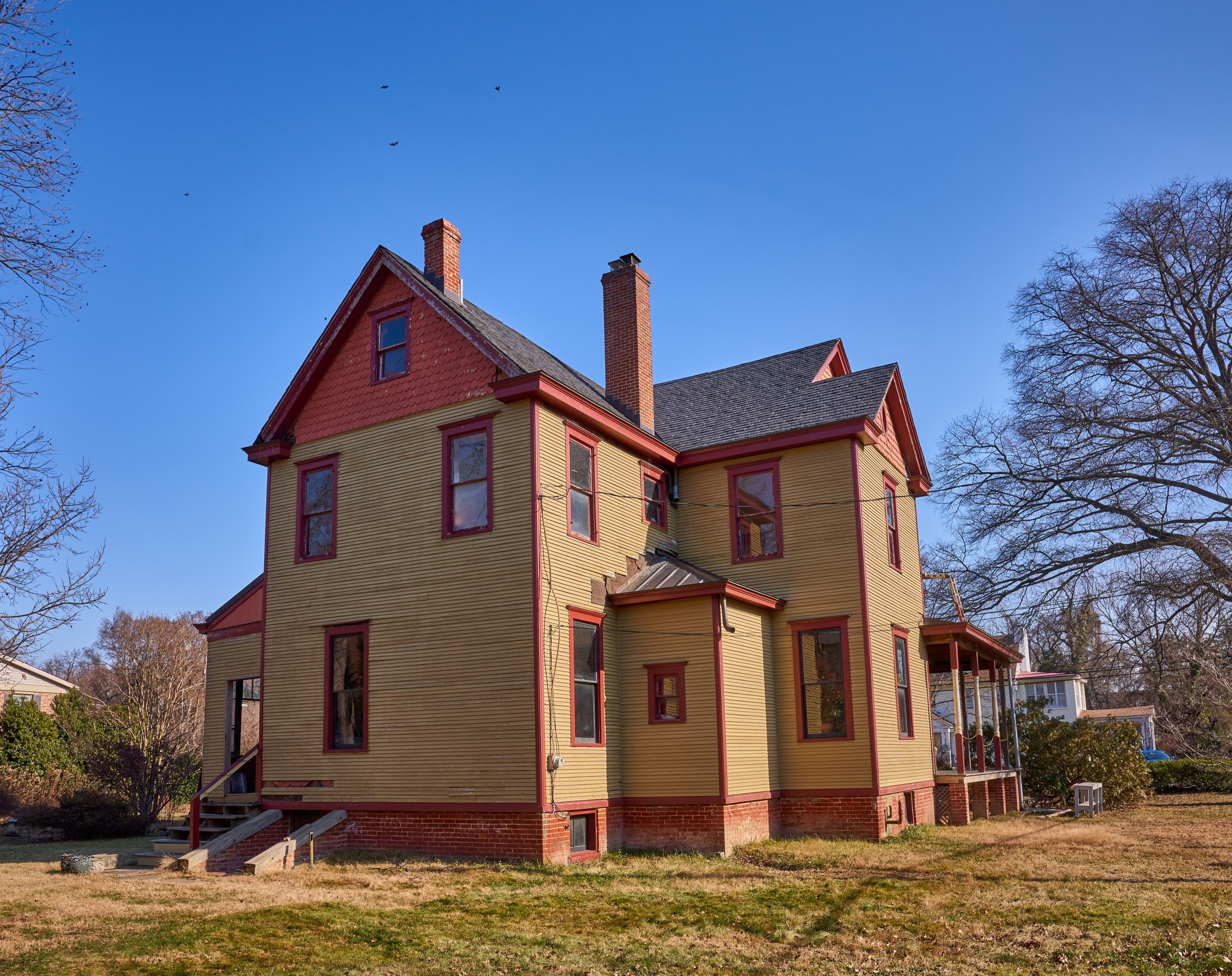
The McDonnell House, built in 1896

=== Cuisine ===
College Park has a diverse range of restaurants offering a wide variety of domestic and international cuisines. Several Chinese and Mexican restaurants are rated among the best in the Washington metropolitan area. The development of the food scene in College Park accelerated in the 21st century following efforts from university officials, Prince George's County leaders, and developers aiming to make the Route 1 corridor a place that would attract more professionals. These efforts led to a significant increase in fine dining and Asian offerings in the city.

== Sports and recreation ==
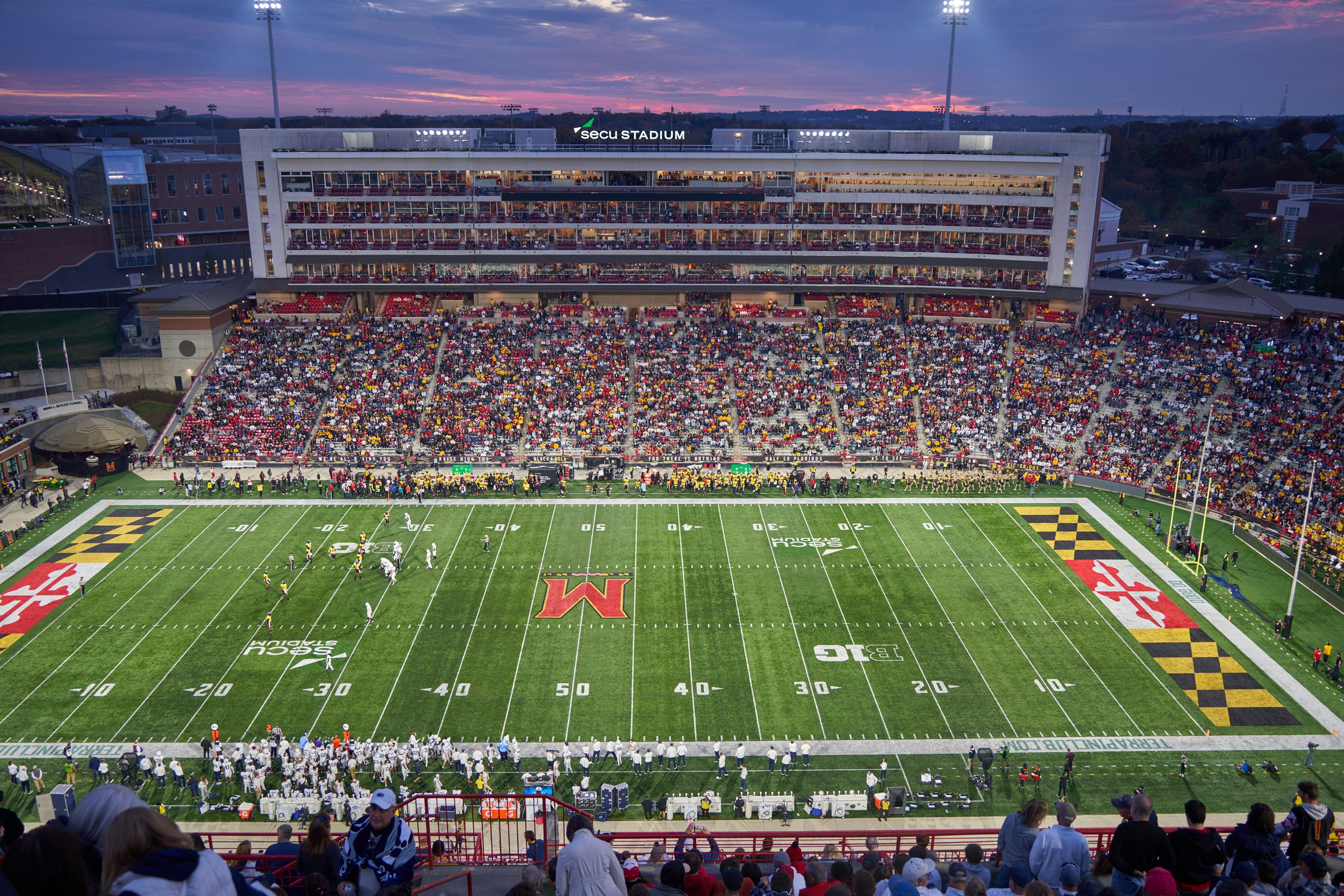
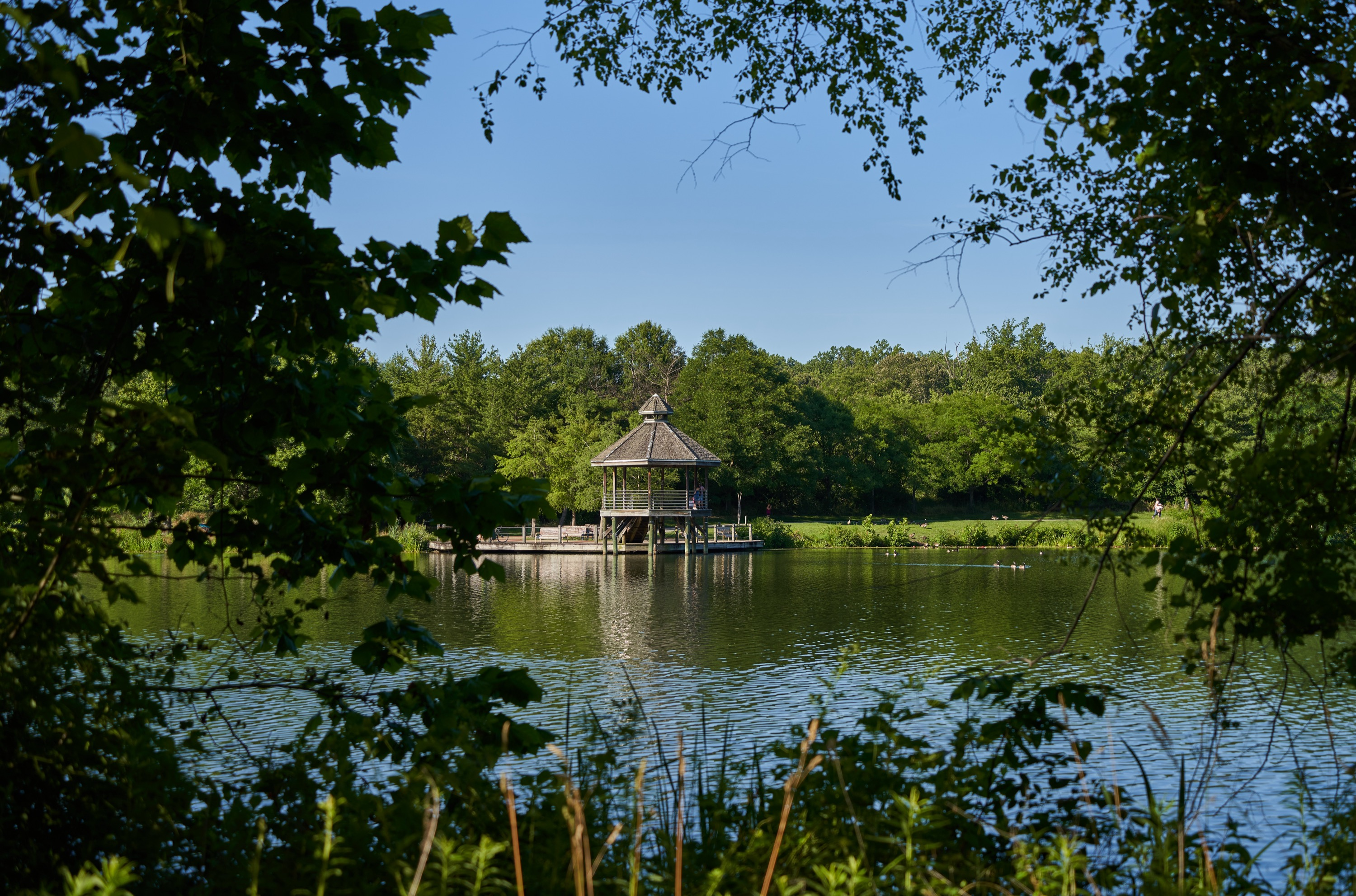
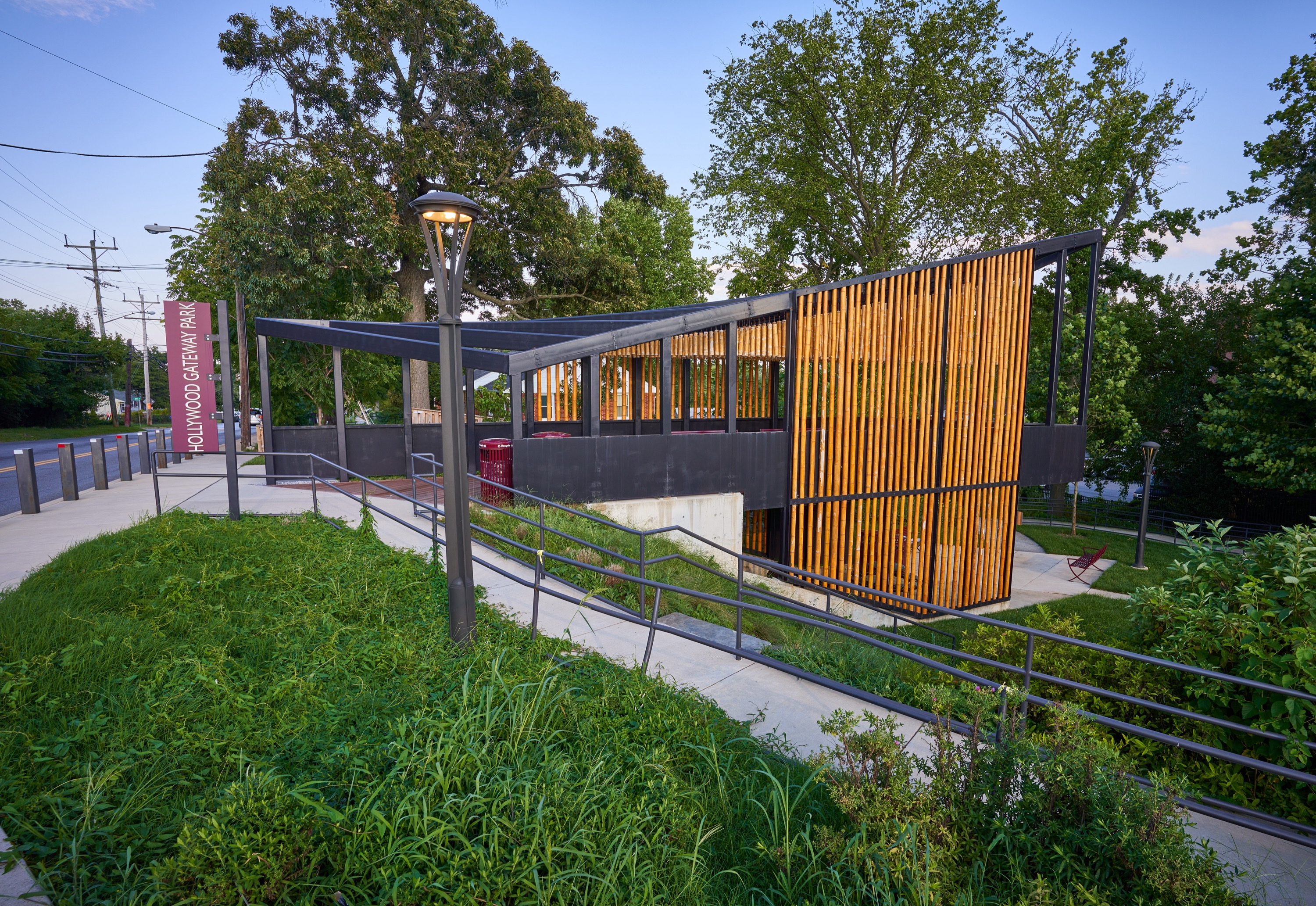
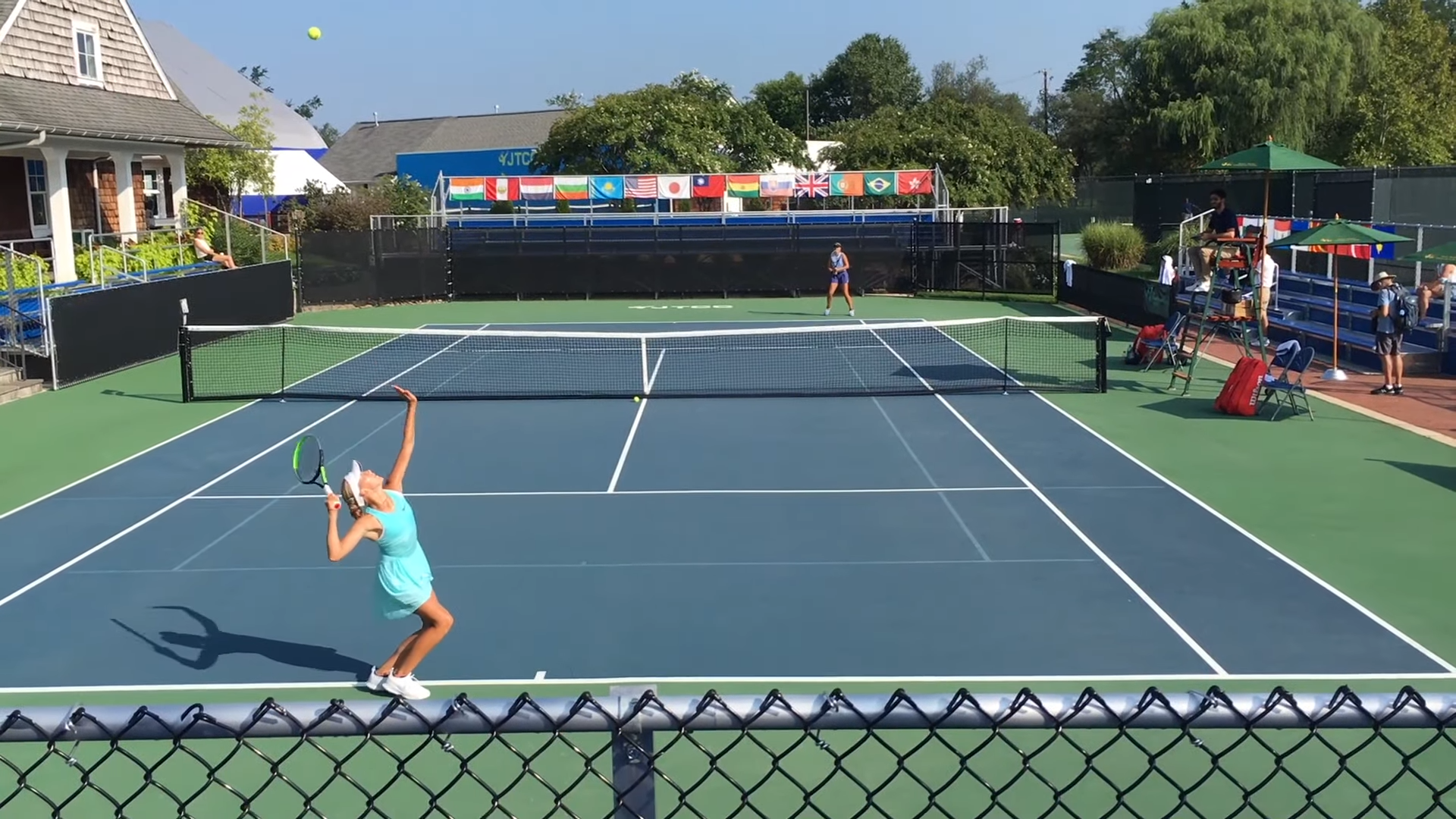
Clockwise from top left: SECU Stadium, Lake Artemesia, JTCC, Hollywood Gateway Park

The sport culture in College Park centers around the 20 men's and women's sports teams fielded by the University of Maryland. These teams compete in the National Collegiate Athletic Association Division I Big Ten Conference and have won 44 national championships. In 2008 and 2010, The Princeton Review named the University of Maryland's athletic facilities the best in the nation. The largest of these facilities are the SECU Stadium for football and lacrosse (capacity 51,802), the XFINITY Center for basketball (capacity 17,950), and the Ludwig Field for soccer (capacity 7,000).

College Park offers 11 parks maintained by the city and the Maryland-national capital park & planning commission. The most popular is Lake Artemesia, a 38-acre lake that includes aquatic gardens, fishing piers, and a 1.35 mile hiker-biker trail around the lake. The lake is considered to provide one of the best inland aquatic habitats in the DC suburban area for birds, hosting over 220 species. The trail around the lake connects to other heavily used trails within the city that are part of the Anacostia Tributary Trail System and the East Coast Greenway, making College Park a regional activity hub. Other parks in the city include the Hollywood Gateway Park, a pocket park in North College Park that opened in 2020, and the Paint Branch Community Park which offers an 18-hole disc golf course.

Runners and walkers from College Park and nearby communities gather most Saturdays for the College Park parkrun, a timed 5-kilometre (3.1 mi) event. With over 39,000 finishes, the College Park parkrun is estimated to be the largest event of its kind in the US.

College Park has a strong culture of board gaming and game development. Wingspan was inspired by bird watching at Lake Artemesia and partially developed at Board and Brew, one of the oldest board game cafés in the United States. The city is the birthplace of Break My Game, a nonprofit organization that helps game developers improve their games by having experienced players play-test them.

Other city attractions include the Junior Tennis Champions Center (JTCC), a tennis training center and preparatory school where top-10 player Frances Tiafoe was raised, the War Veterans Memorial, the Ellen E. Linson Splash Park, featuring slides, diving boards, and lap lanes, and the Herbert Wells Ice Rink, a semi-enclosed seasonal ice rink in the same facility.

== City government ==
College Park has operated under the council-manager form of government since 1960. The City Council is the legislative body of the city and makes all city policy. The council has eight members, representing four districts in the city. The council is elected by district every 2 years in non-partisan elections. The Mayor is elected at large on the same election schedule as the City Council. City Council meetings are held weekly at the College Park City Hall. The mayors of College Park have been:

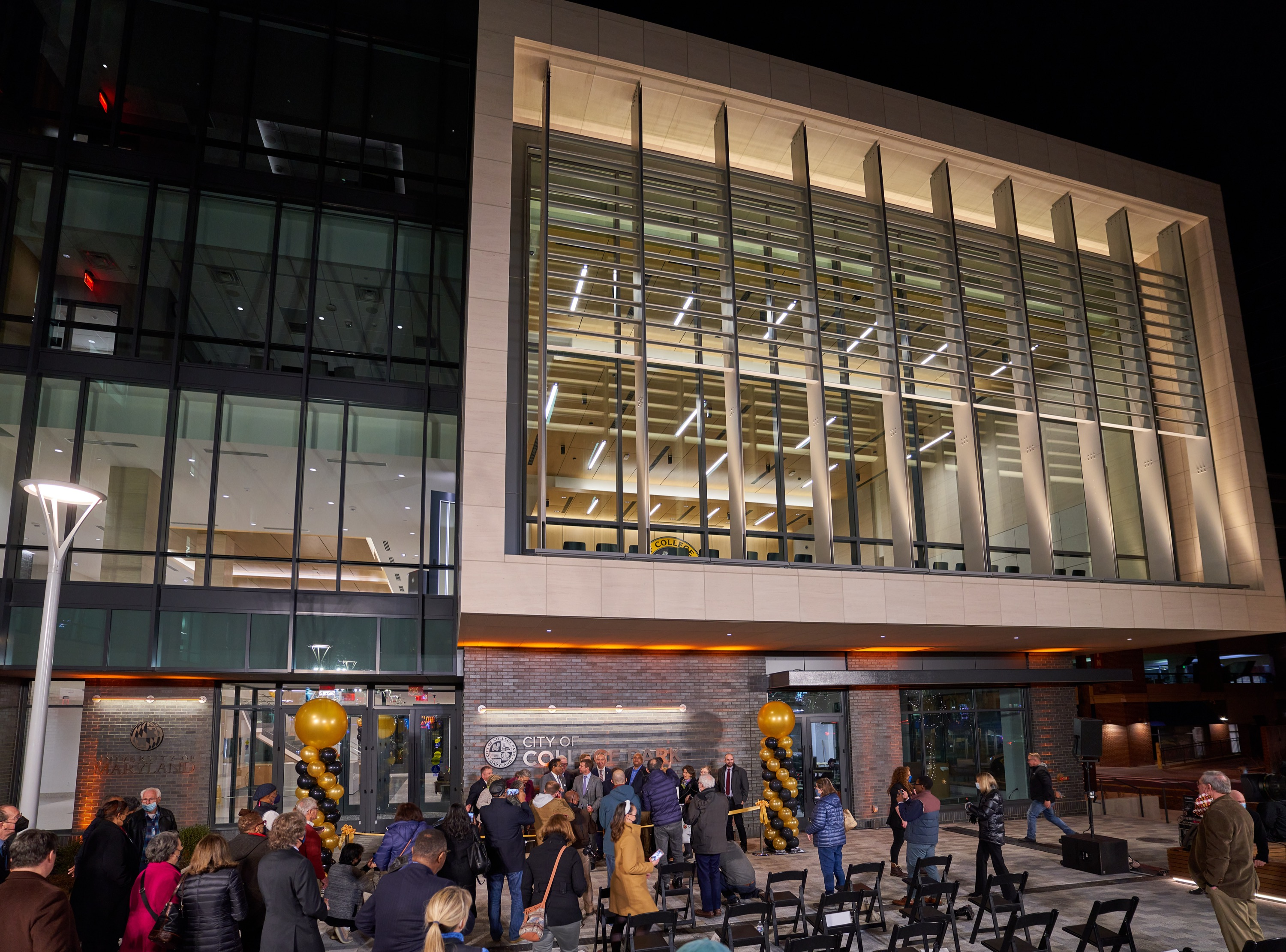
College Park City Hall ribbon cutting by city government officials

- William A. Duvall (1945–1951)
- Charles R. Davis (1951–1963)
- William W. Gullett (1963–1969)
- William R. Reading (1969–1973)
- Dervey A. Lomax (1973–1975)
- St. Clair Reeves (1975–1981)
- Alvin J. Kushner (1981–1987)
- Anna Latta Owens (1987–1993)
- Joseph E. Page (1993–1997)
- Michael J. Jacobs (1997–2001)
- Stephen A. Brayman (2001–2009)
- Andrew M. Fellows (2009–2015)
- Patrick L. Wojahn (2015–2023)
- Denise C. Mitchell, Acting (2023)
- S.M. Fazlul Kabir (2023–present)

The Council appoints the City Manager, who manages all city services, implements the policy established by the City Council, and appoints and supervises the heads of the various city department. The City Manager also serves as an adviser to the City Council. The manager's office manages the day-to-day activities and financial affairs of the city, and oversees communications and IT for the city.

The government of College Park has five operating functions: General Government and Administration; Public Services, Planning and Community Development; Youth, Family and Senior Services; and Public Works. In addition to the Finance Department, the General Government and Administration function includes the offices/departments of the City Manager, Economic Development, City Clerk, Human Resources, City Attorney, Communications and Information Technology.

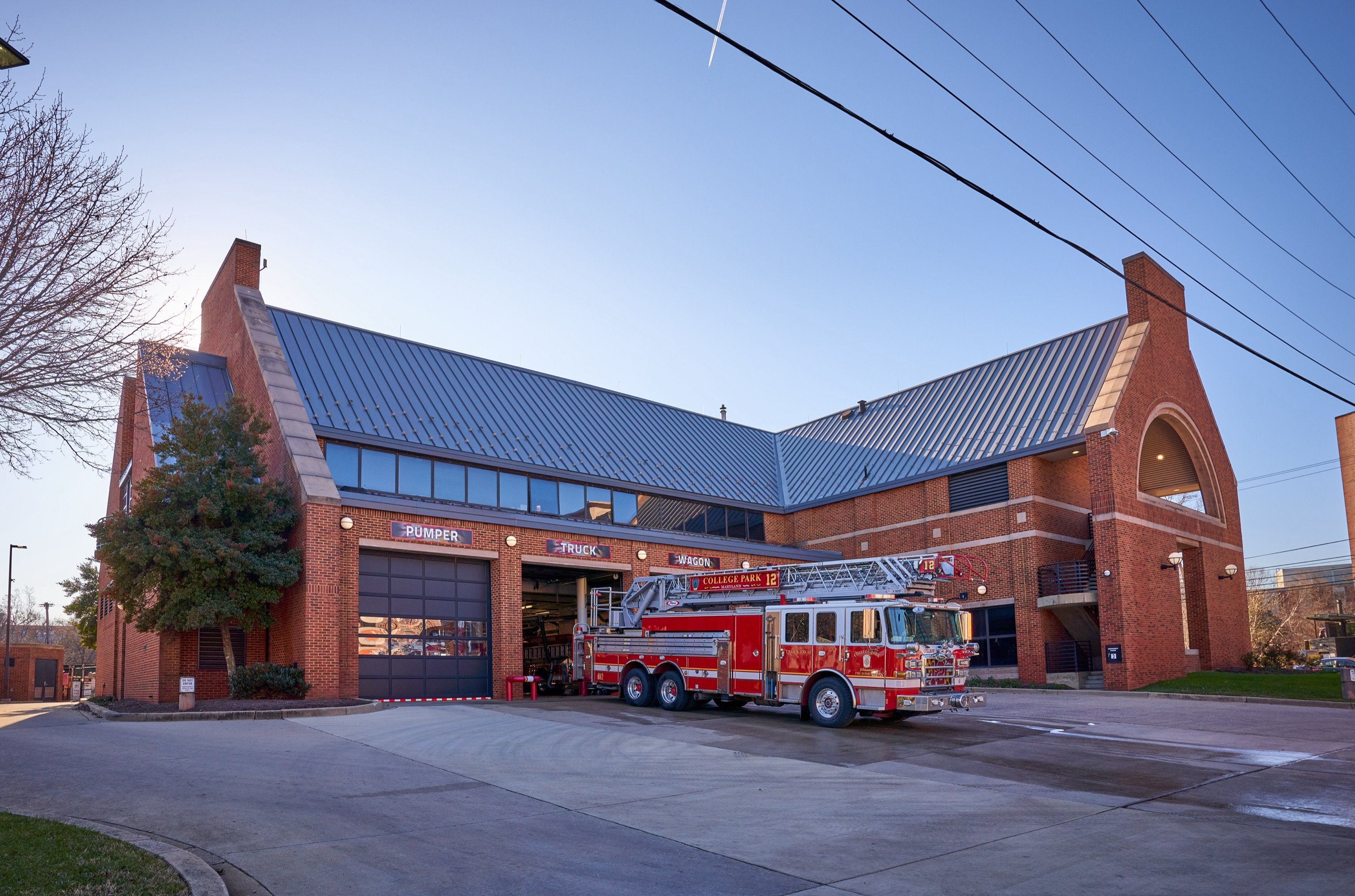
The College Park Volunteer Fire Department base of operations

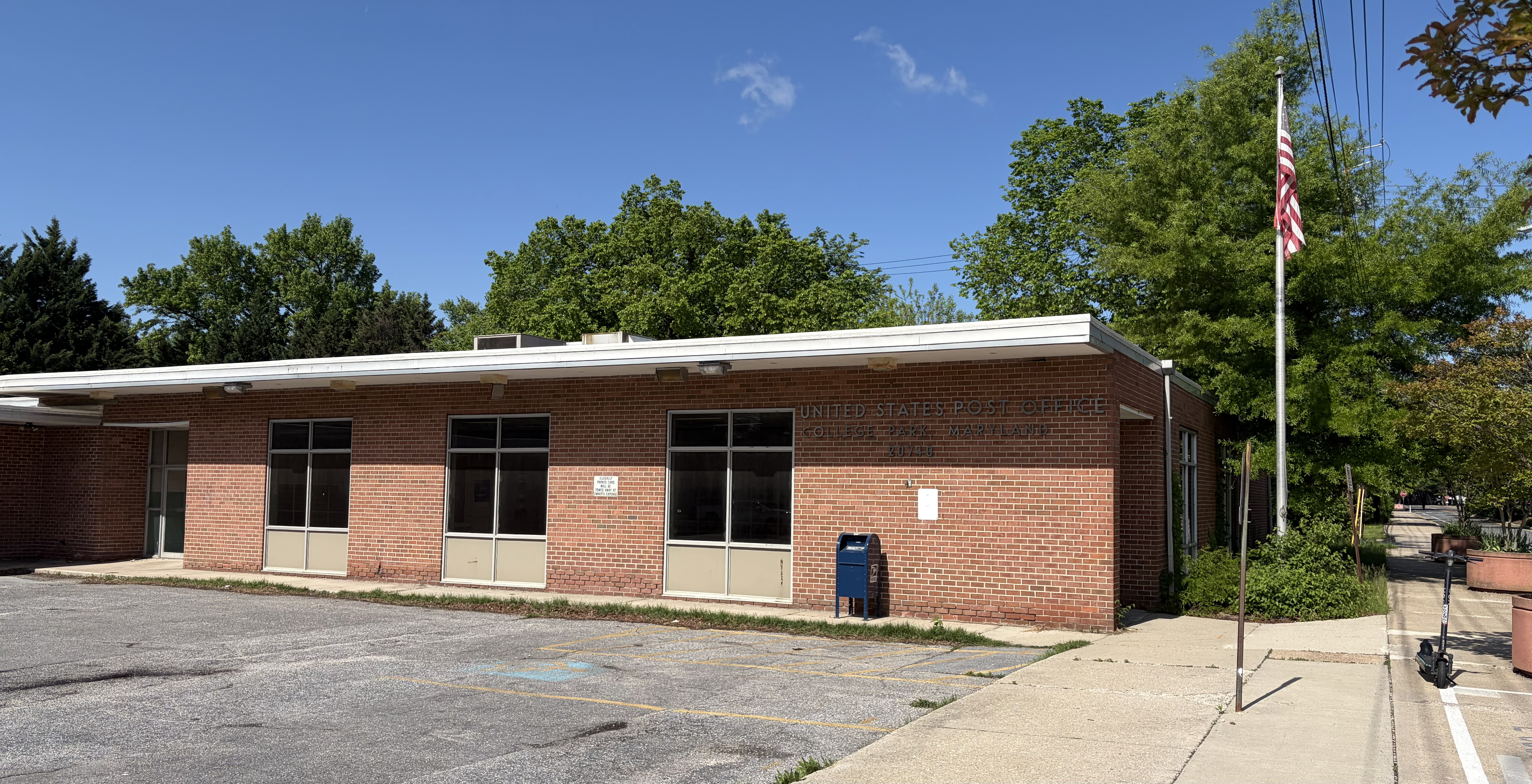
Old College Park post office

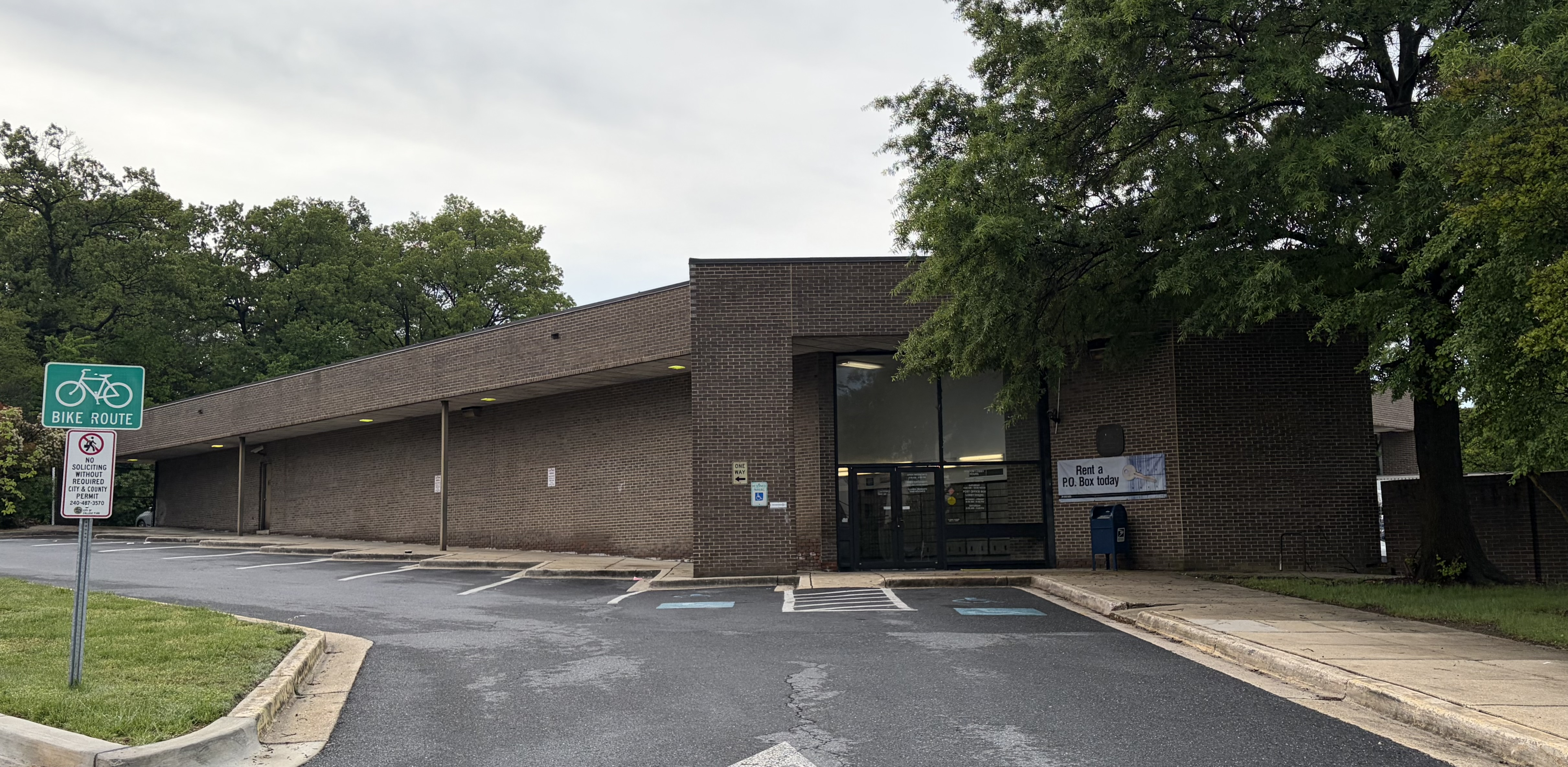
North College Park post office

The Prince George's County Police Department District 1 Station in Hyattsville serves College Park. The U.S. Postal Service operates the College Park Post Office and the North College Park Post Office. The College Park Volunteer Fire Department responds to emergencies in the University of Maryland, City of College Park and northern Prince George's County areas.

As of March 2023, College Park belongs to Maryland's 4th congressional district.

=== City-student politics ===
University of Maryland students make up about 55% of the population of College Park, but their involvement in the city government is limited. Their turnout in city elections varies between 2% and 15%, compared to the 40% average of the rest of the College Park residents. There are efforts to increase this participation both from the university's student liaison to the council and council members themselves.

Students living within the city are eligible to run for city elections and in 2009 Marcus Afzali, a 24-year-old doctoral student in the Department of Government and Politics, was elected to the city council.

== Education ==
=== Colleges and universities ===
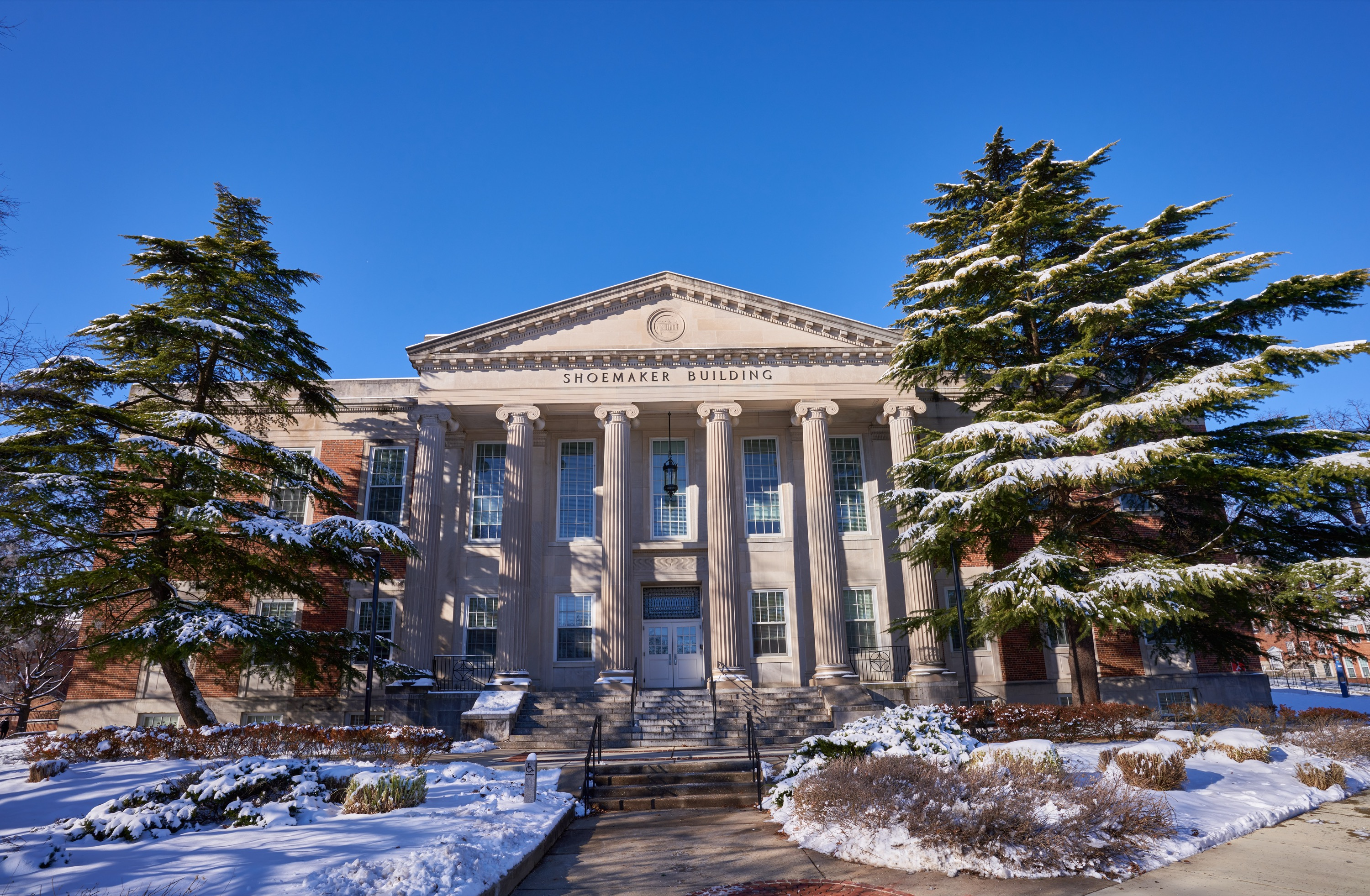
The Shoemaker building at the University Maryland College Park

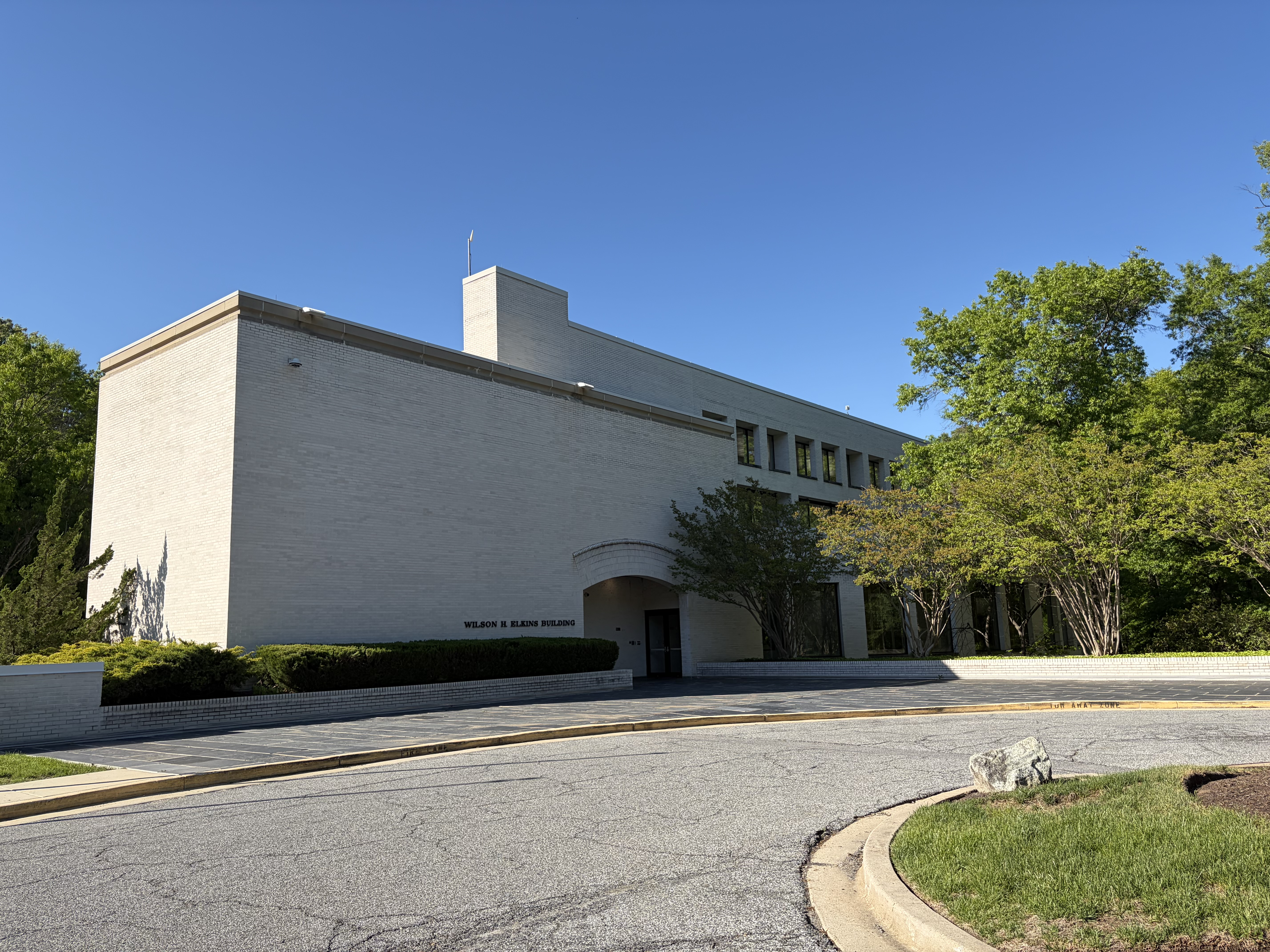
The Wilson H. Elkins Building, headquarters of the University System of Maryland in College Park

The University of Maryland, College Park, the flagship institution of the University System of Maryland, is located within the College Park city limits. With over 40,000 enrolled students, it is also the largest campus-based university in both the state and the Washington metropolitan area.

The headquarters for the University of Maryland Global Campus, the largest online public university in the U.S., are located in Adelphi, MD, right next to the University of Maryland College Park campus. UMGC is the second largest employer in College Park.

=== Primary and secondary schools ===
==== Public schools ====
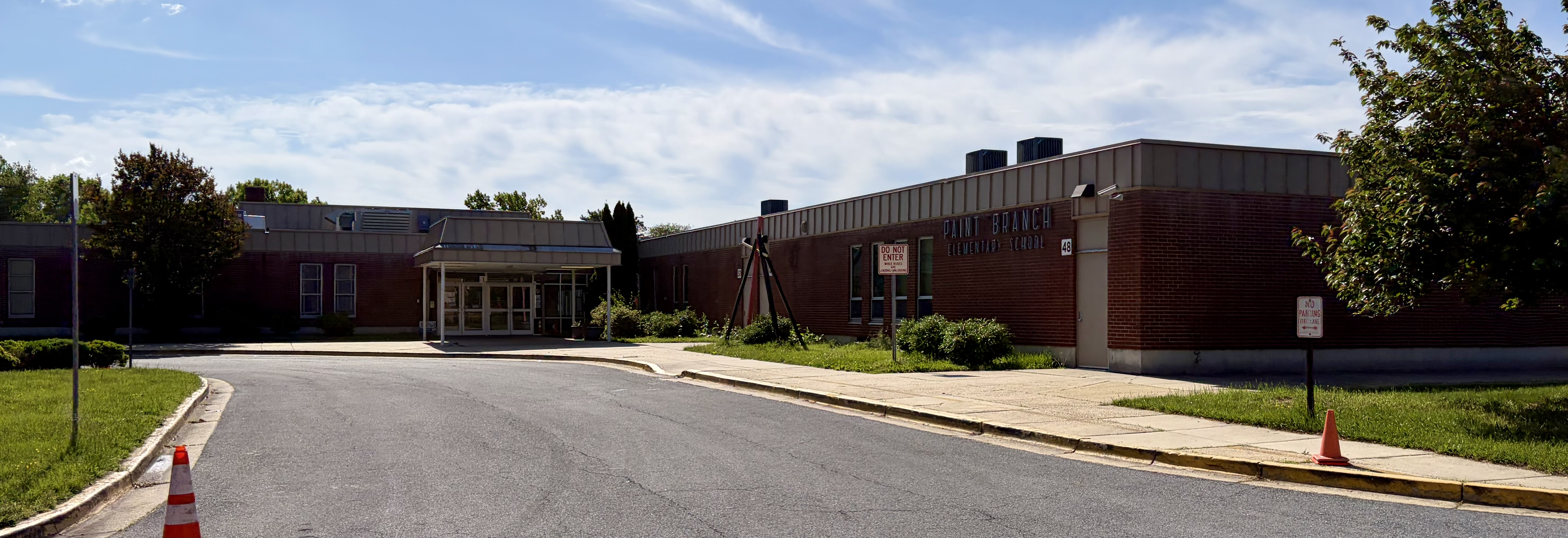
Paint Branch Elementary School

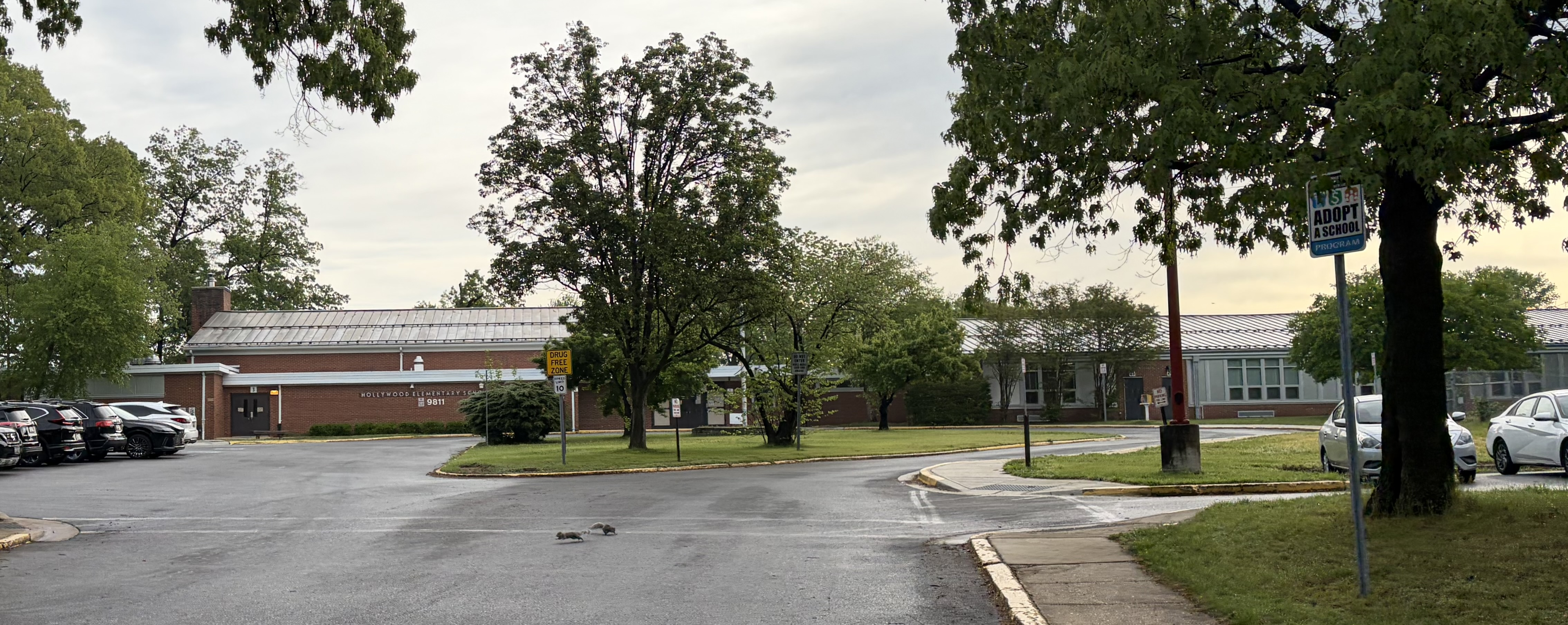
Hollywood Elementary School

College Park is served by Prince George's County Public Schools. Elementary school students are zoned to Hollywood ES and Paint Branch ES in College Park, Berwyn Heights ES, University Park ES, and Cherokee Lane ES in Adelphi. Middle school students are zoned to Greenbelt MS, Hyattsville MS, and Buck Lodge MS in Adelphi. High school students are zoned to High Point HS in Beltsville, Northwestern HS in Hyattsville, and Parkdale HS in Riverdale Park. Another public high school in the area is Eleanor Roosevelt High School in Greenbelt; the municipal government listed it on its website as a school in the area.

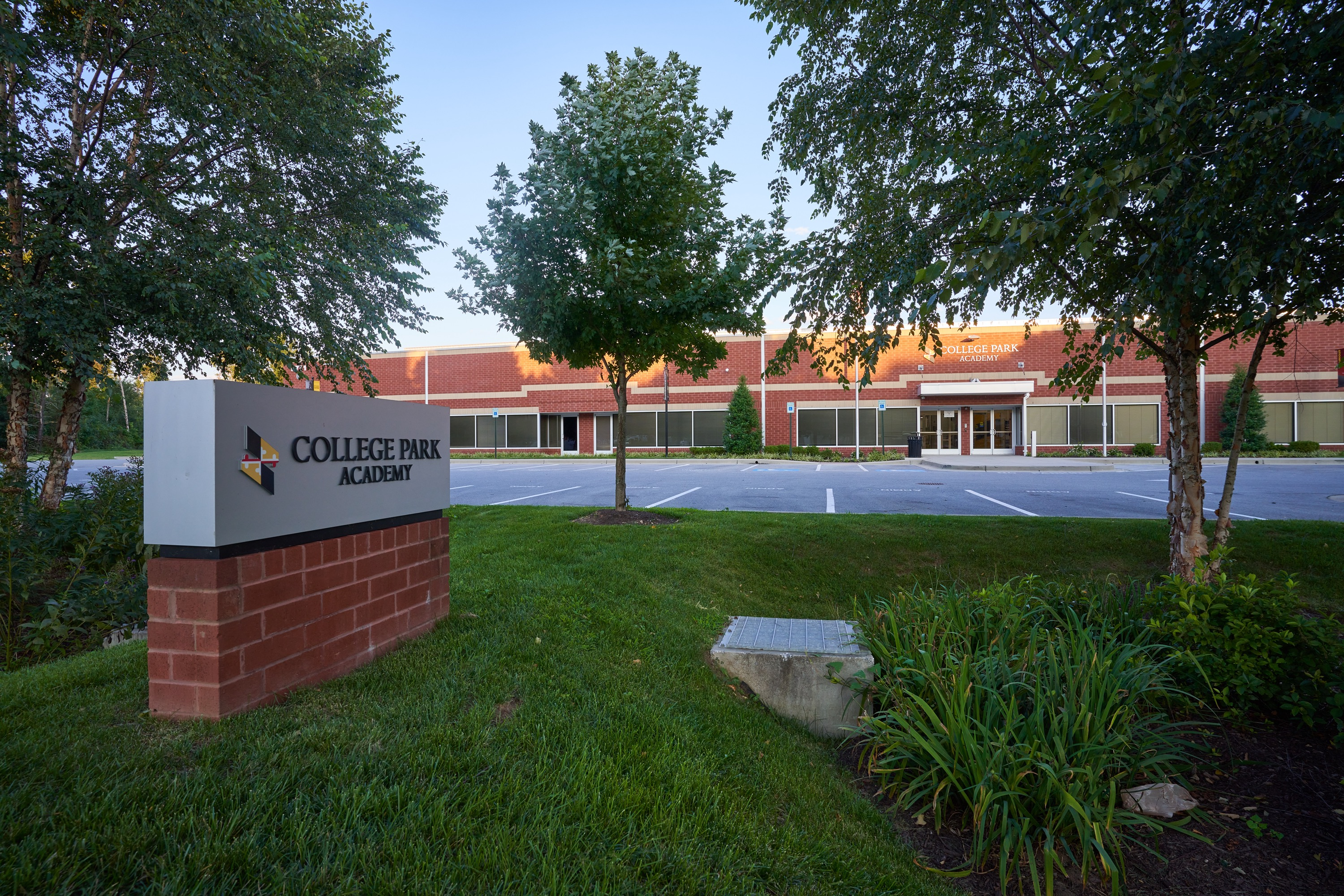
The front sign of the College Park Academy

Additionally, the College Park Academy is a grade 6-12 charter school currently located in Riverdale Park. This school was launched in 2013 by the College Park City-University Partnership aiming to improve the perception of local public schools.

==== Private schools ====
Private schools include:

- Dar-us-Salaam/Al Huda School, K–12 (College Park)
- Berwyn Baptist School, PreK–8
- Friends Community School, K–8
- Holy Redeemer School, PreK–8
- Laurel Springs School at Junior Tennis Champions Center, K–12
- Saint Francis International School St. Mark Campus, K–8, Hyattsville (affiliated with the Roman Catholic Archdiocese of Washington) – formerly St. Mark the Evangelist School, closed and merged into Saint Francis International, which opened in 2010.

== Media ==
The city is part of the Washington, D.C. television market (DMA #9). Local media sources include:

- The Diamondback, a student publication, formerly distributed once a week on a limited basis downtown, including in city hall, and widely on the campus of the University of Maryland. Print editions were discontinued in March 2020, and the newspaper was moved entirely online.
- College Park: Here & Now: a free monthly nonprofit newspaper available throughout the city which began publishing in 2020.
- UMTV: the cable television station operated by the Philip Merrill College of Journalism at the University of Maryland.
- WMUC broadcasts from the University of Maryland campus, with a range of two miles (3.2 km) – roughly from the campus to the Beltway. It is also broadcast over the internet at www.wmucradio.com.
- The oldest operational Persian podcast is called Radio College Park as it is produced by a group of Iranian graduate students at the University of Maryland, College Park.

== Transportation ==
=== Roads and highways ===
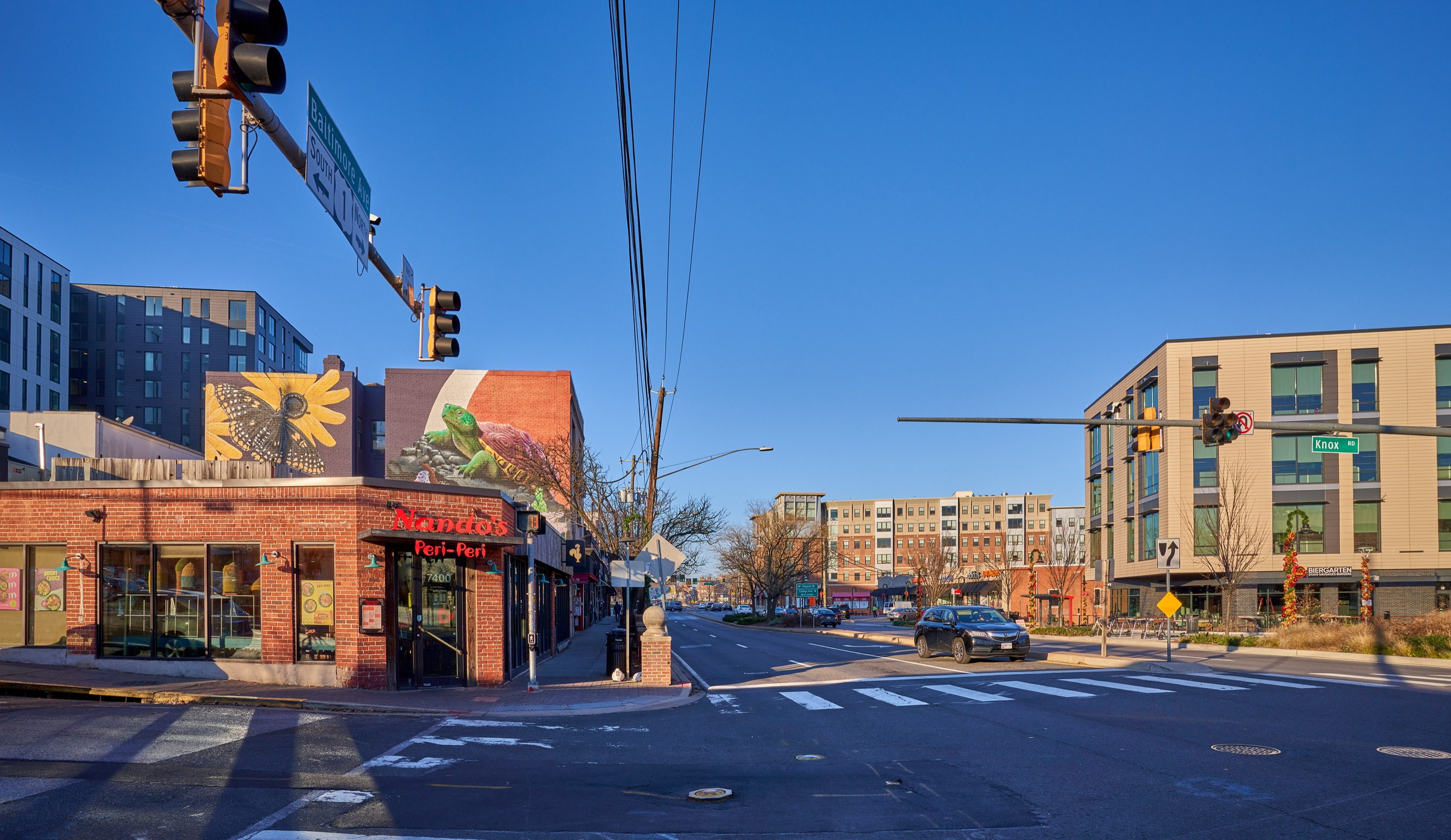
View of Baltimore Avenue as it crosses downtown College Park

U.S. Route 1 is the main artery traversing College Park in a north–south orientation. This road is called Baltimore Avenue in this area and it connects College Park to neighboring communities to the south such as Riverdale Park, Hyattsville, and Washington, D.C. In North College Park, Baltimore Avenue provides direct access to Interstate 95/Interstate 495, the Capital Beltway. I-495 encircles Washington, D.C., via the Capital Beltway, providing access to the city and its many suburbs. I-95 only follows the eastern portion of the beltway, diverging away from the beltway near its northeasternmost and southwesternmost points. To the north, I-95 passes through Baltimore, Philadelphia, New York City and Boston on its way to Canada, while to the south, it traverses Richmond on its way to Florida.

Maryland State Route 193 also passes through the city, following University Boulevard and Greenbelt Road from west to east. MD 431 also serves College Park, linking it with Riverdale Park.

=== Bicycle trails ===
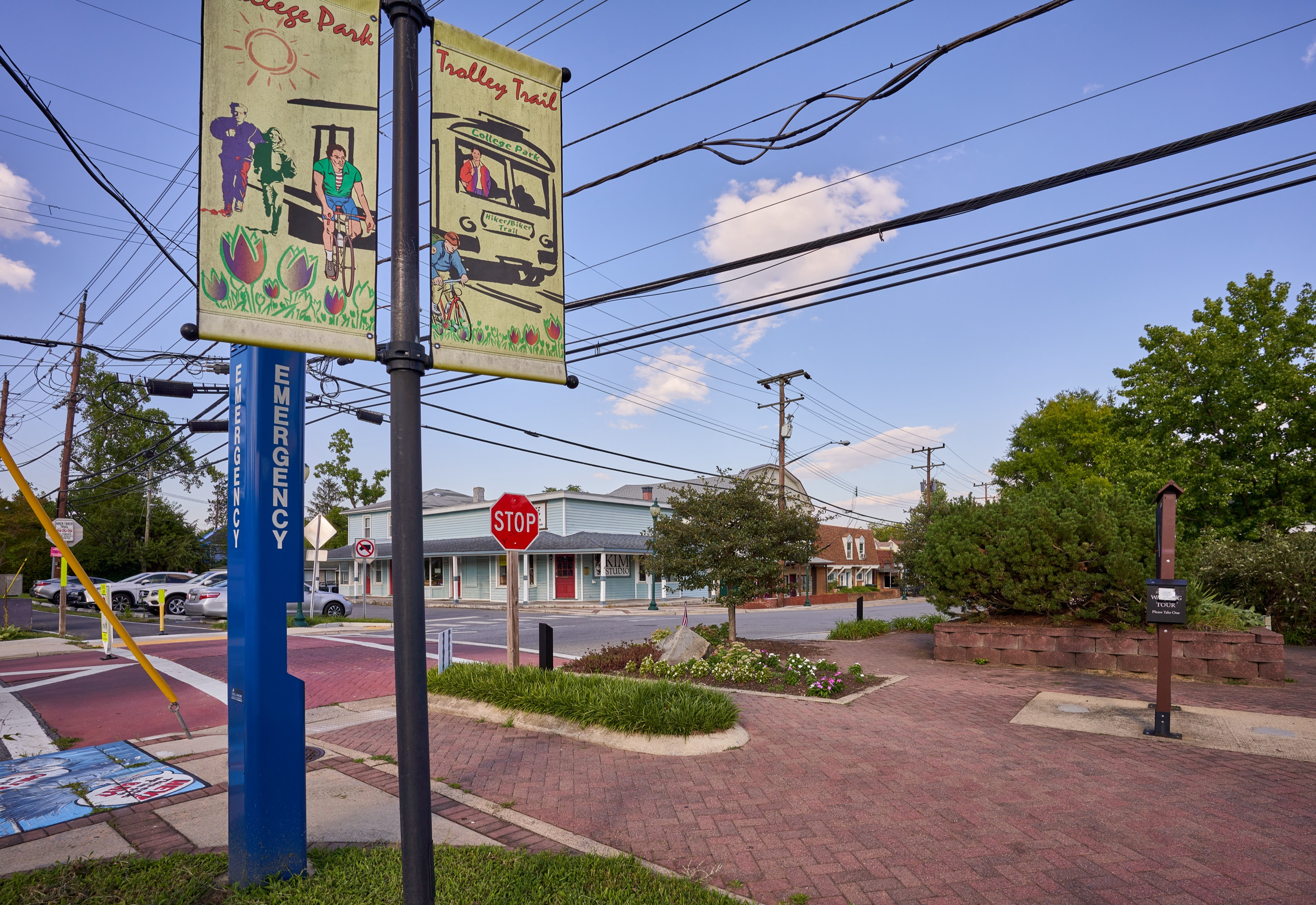
The Trolley Trail as it crosses Berwyn Road in College Park

College Park has several miles of interconnected dedicated hiking/biking trails. The most popular one is the Trolley Trail, a 3.8-mile (6.1 km) trail that runs along Rhode Island Avenue. This trail runs from Greenbelt Road in North College Park to its intersection with the Northwest branch trail in South Hyattsville, and takes advantage of the right-of-way that had been used by streetcars connecting College Park to Washington, D.C., between 1903 and 1962.

Other dedicated bicycle trails in the city include the 1.35-mile (2.2 km) Lake Artemesia trail encircling Lake Artemesia, the 3.5-mile (5.6 km) Paint Branch trail connecting Lake Artemesia with North College Park following the Pain Branch stream, and the Indian Creek trail. These three trails converge in southeast College Park with the Northeast Branch trail, which is part of the extensive Anacostia Tributary Trail System and the East Coast Greenway, enabling commutes to areas such as Washington, D.C., or Silver Spring along dedicated bicycle pathways. College Park is ranked as the second most bikeable city in the state by Redfin, and the University of Maryland has a Gold-Level Bike-Friendly Campus designation by the League of American Bicyclists.

=== Airport ===
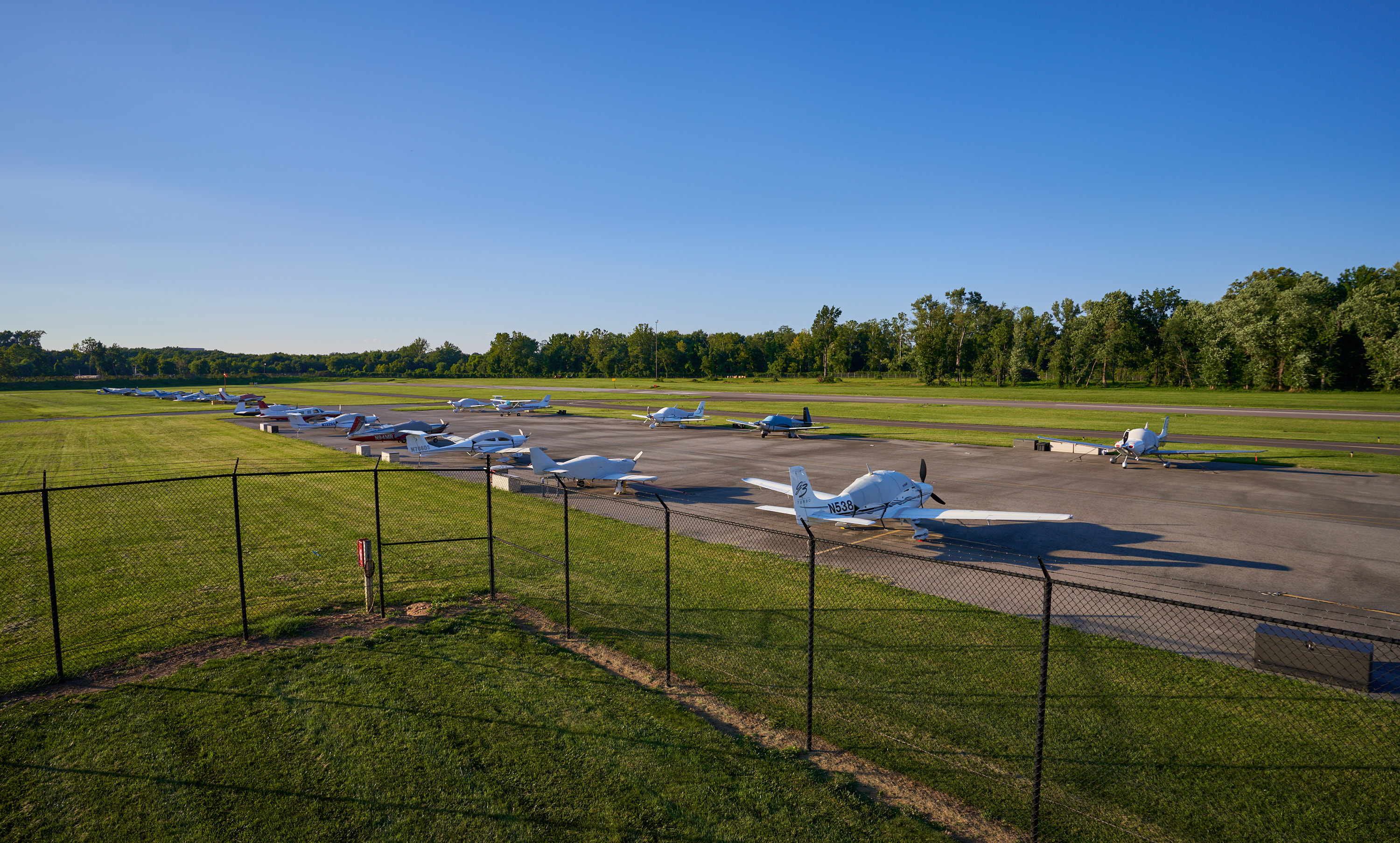
Planes parked at the College Park airport with the runway in the background

College Park Airport is the oldest continuously operating airport in the United States and is one of the oldest airports in the world, having been in continuous operation since 1909. It originated as the site where the U.S. government began to train pilots, under the tutelage of Wilbur Wright, for military purposes. Its future status is uncertain, as it lies just a few miles outside the restricted airspace of Washington, D.C. In 1977, the airport was added to the National Register of Historic Places.

Area commercial airports include Baltimore-Washington International Airport, Reagan National Airport, and Washington Dulles International Airport.

=== Public transportation ===
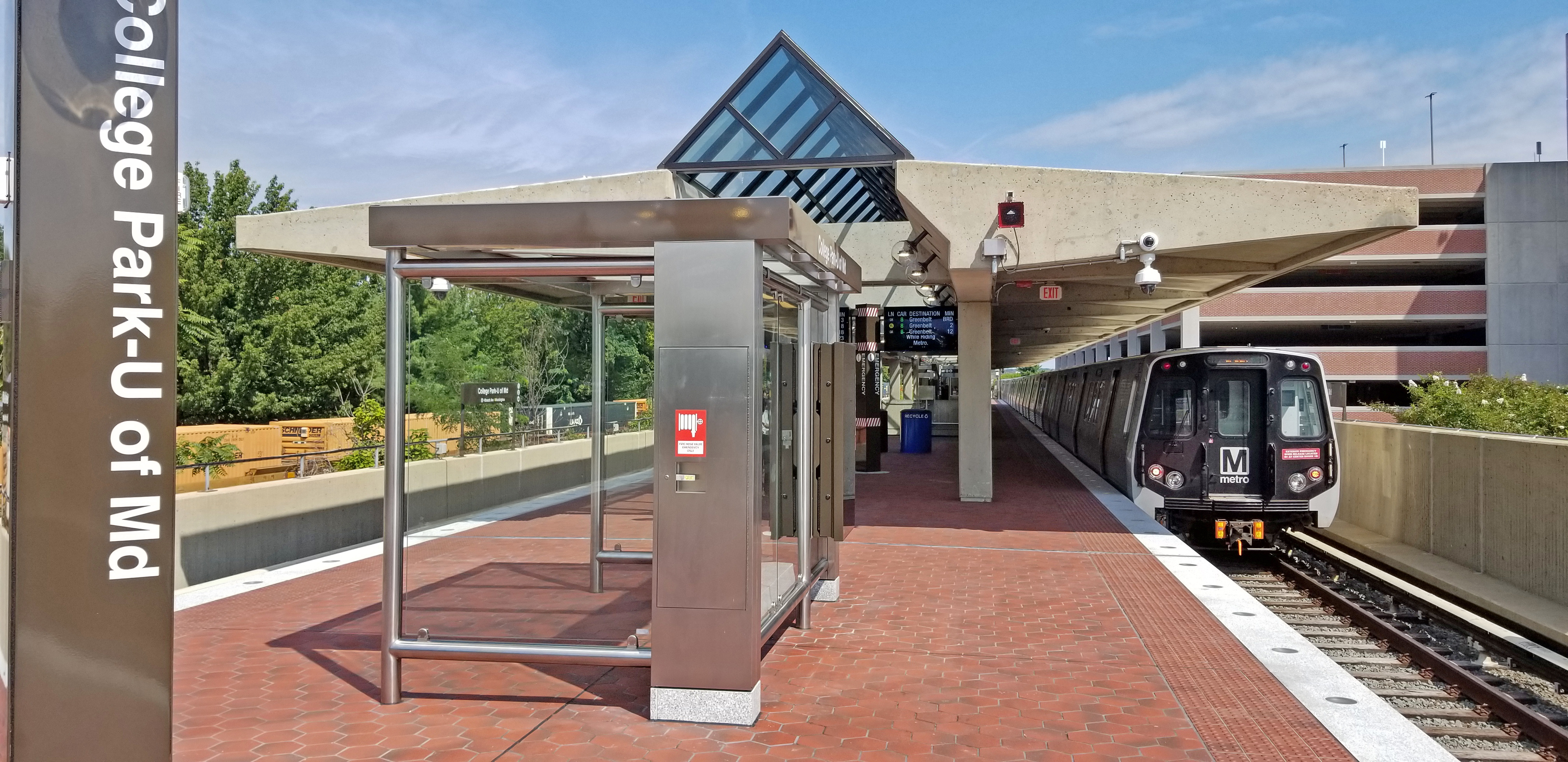
College Park has a station on Washington Metro's Green and Yellow Lines.

College Park–University of Maryland Station on the Washington Metro's Green and Yellow Lines is in College Park; a large commuter parking garage was completed in 2004 adjacent to the Metro station. MARC trains run on CSX tracks adjacent to the Green Line and stop at a small station next to the College Park Metro station. The Metro station lies at what had been the historic junction of Calvert Road and the CSX tracks.

Five Purple Line light rail stations will serve College Park when the system opens in 2027: Adelphi Road, Campus Drive, Baltimore Avenue, College Park Metro and Riverdale Park North. University of Maryland students, faculty and staff will be able to ride fare-free among those stops. The Purple Line will link the Metro's Red, Green, Yellow, and Orange lines. As well as the MARC commuter rail's Penn and Camden lines. The Purple Line station on the University of Maryland campus will eliminate the need for a bus route to the university's main Metro station, the Green line's College Park – U of Md station.
