= History of College Park, Maryland =

The written history of College Park, Maryland begins with the early Europeans that settled in the area since the 18th century. After the predecessor of the University of Maryland, the Maryland Agricultural College, was chartered in 1856, a series of neighborhoods developed in the area, also influenced by the deployment of a streetcar along what is now Rhode Island Avenue. The neighborhoods developed quickly throughout the 20th century and they incorporated into the City of College Park in 1945.

College Park had important contributions to the history of aviation. The College Park Airport, established in 1909, is the world's oldest continuously operated airport. The College Park Aviation Museum, attached to the airport and an affiliate of the Smithsonian Institution, houses antique and reproduction aircraft as well as materials relating to early aviation history.

In 2014 the University of Maryland launched the Greater College Park initiative, a $2 billion public-private investment to revitalize the community around the university, develop a robust Discovery District and create one of the nation’s best college towns. As a result, the city is experiencing significant development that has led to new housing, office space, schools, grocery stores, restaurants, and other amenities.

== Early history ==
The earliest evidence of human activity in the College Park area was found at an archeological site just south of Archives II. Projectile points of Clagett and Vernon styles dating from 3000 to 2600 B.C. were recovered, a notable find given their location away from a river. This finding together with other similar ones indicate that the native American population became more sedentary in the Late Archaic period as the availability of local food supply increased, and social complexity grew. By the time Europeans first arrived and colonized the region in the early 17th century, the various native American groups had aligned themselves into a chiefdom under the Piscataway people.

Throughout the 17th and 18th centuries, the European settlers lived on large plantations, some holding the original grants under Lord Baltimore. In College Park, there are records for Toaping Castle, a land grant to Col. Isaac Walker from about 1745 in the area between Branchville, Greenbelt, and Berwyn Heights, and for the Calvert family's Riversdale, which included parts of South College Park. One of the oldest buildings in the city, the Old Parish House dating from 1817 was initially a farm building in the latter estate.

== 19th century ==
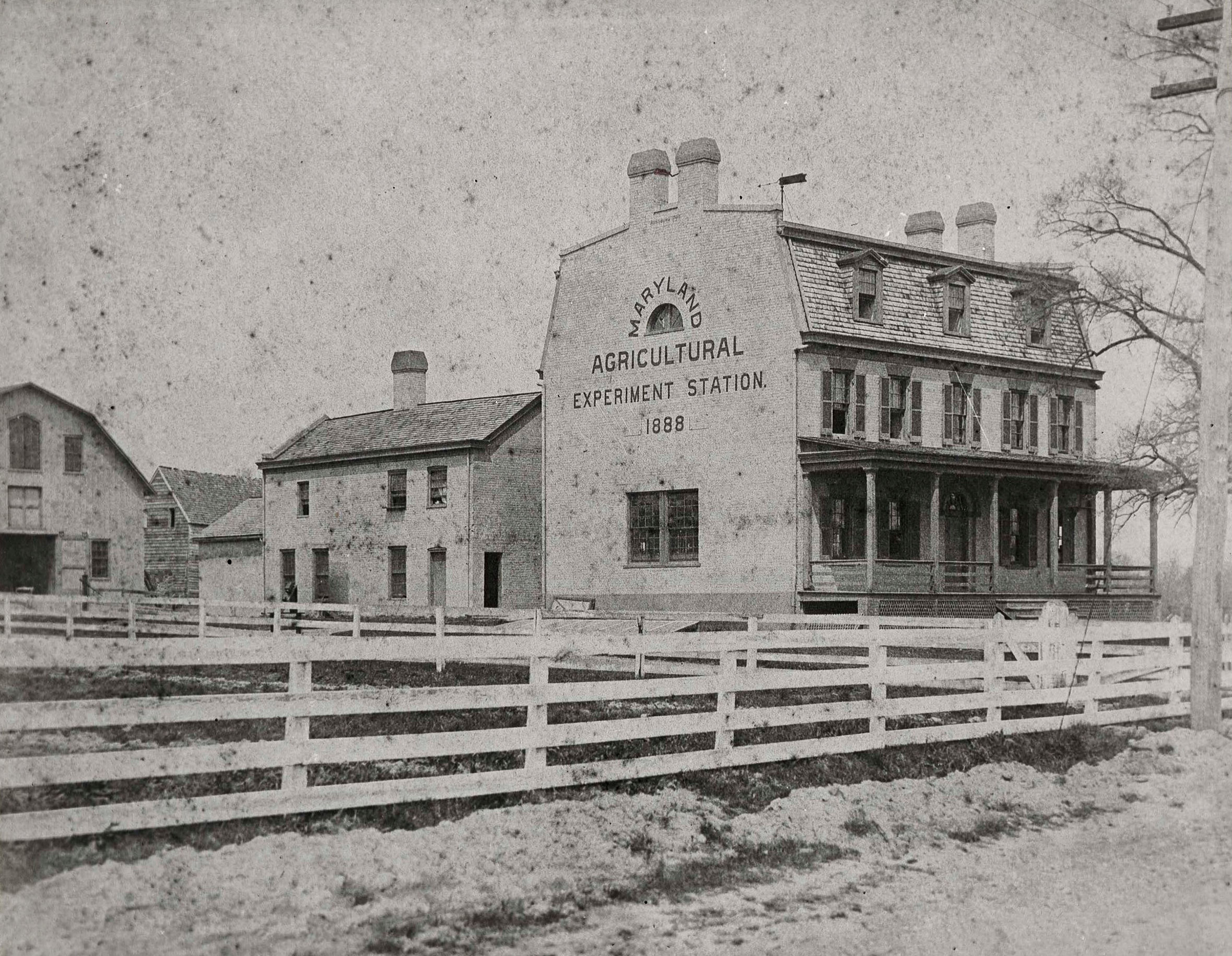
Rossborough Inn, part of the Maryland Agricultural College ca. 1901

The oldest standing building in College Park is the Rossborough Inn, whose construction began in 1798 and was completed in 1812. The forerunner of today's University of Maryland was chartered in 1856 as the Maryland Agricultural College, and would become a land grant college in February 1864.

The original College Park subdivision was first platted in 1872 by Eugene Campbell. Early maps called the local post office "College Lawn". The area remained undeveloped and was re-platted in 1889 by John O. Johnson and Samuel Curriden, Washington real estate developers. The original 125-acre (0.51 km^{2}) tract was divided into a grid-street pattern with long, narrow building lots, with a standard lot size of 50 feet (15 m) by 200 feet (61 m). College Park originally included single-family residences constructed in the Shingle, Queen Anne, and Stick styles, as well as modest vernacular dwellings.

By the turn of the century College Park was being developed rapidly, catering to those who were seeking to escape the crowded Washington, D.C., as well as to a rapidly expanding staff of college faculty and employees.

== 20th century ==
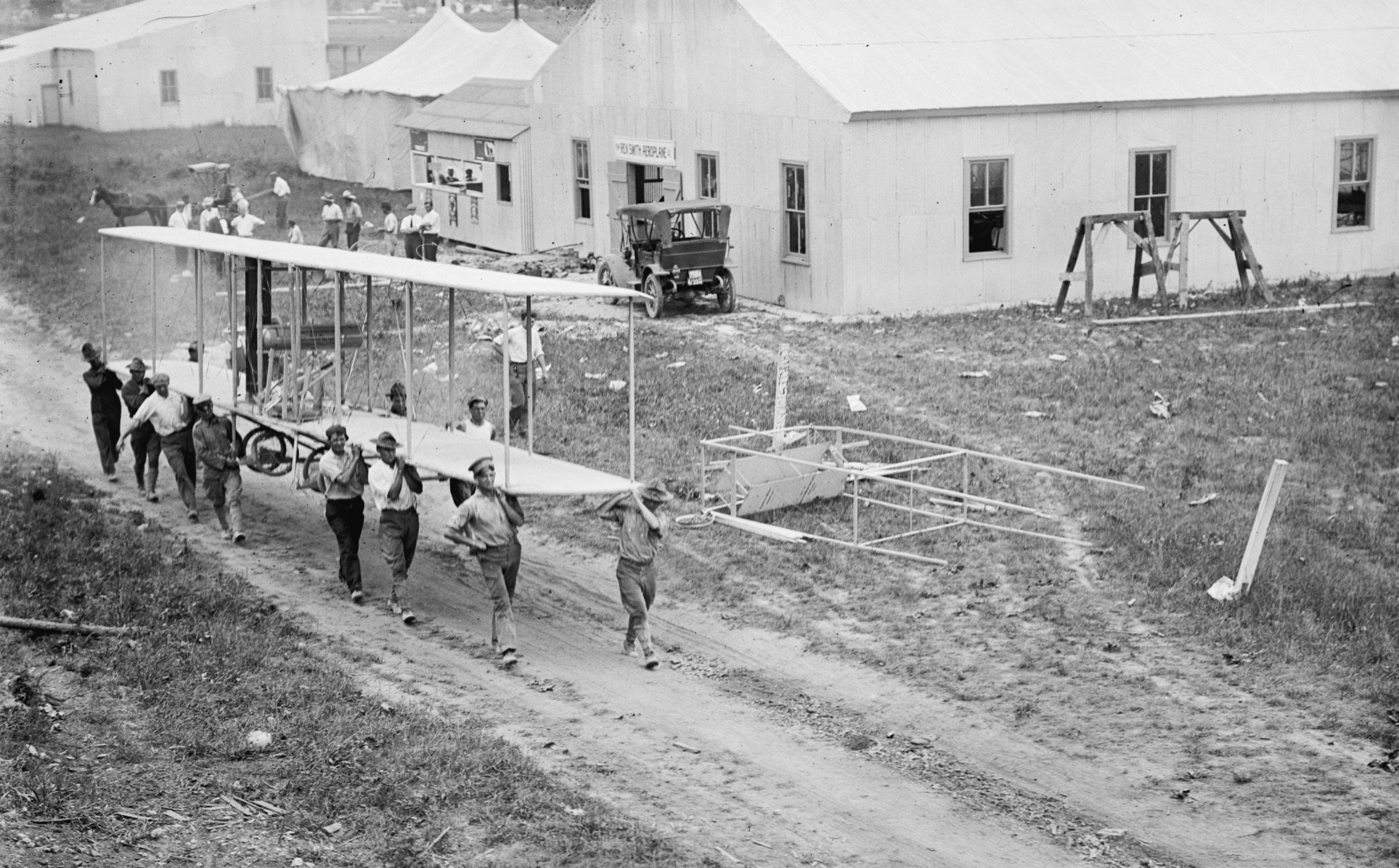
Army workers carrying the wreck of the Wright brothers plane at the College Park airport in 1911

In 1909 the College Park Airport was established by the United States Army Signal Corps to serve as a training location for Wilbur Wright to instruct military officers to fly in the US government's first airplane. Civilian aircraft began flying from College Park Airport as early as December 1911, making it the world's oldest continuously operated airport.

Commercial development in the city increased in the 1920s, aided by the increased automobile traffic and the growing campus along Baltimore Avenue/Route 1. By the late 1930s, most of the original subdivision had been partially developed. Several fraternities and sororities from the University of Maryland built houses in the neighborhood. After World War II, construction consisted mostly of infill of ranch and split-level houses. After incorporation in 1945, the city continued to grow, and a municipal center was built in 1959.

The Lakeland neighborhood was developed beginning in 1890 around the Baltimore and Ohio Railroad, whose Branchville and Calvert Road depots were located approximately one mile to the north and south, respectively. Lakeland was created by Edwin Newman, who improved the original 238 acres (0.96 km^{2}) located to the west of the railroad. He also built a number of the original homes, a small town hall, and a general store. The area was originally envisioned as a resort-type community. However, due to the flood-prone, low-lying topography, the neighborhood became an area of African-American settlement. Around 1900, the Baltimore Gold Fish Company built five artificial lakes in the area to spawn goldfish and rarer species of fish. By 1903 Lakeland was an established African-American community with a school and two churches. Lakeland was central in a group of African American communities located along Route One through Prince George's County. Lakeland High School opened in 1928 with funding from the Rosenwald Fund, the African American community and the county. Lakeland High served all African American students in the northern half of the county until 1950 when it was converted to a facility for lower grades. The community's first Rosenwald school was a new elementary which opened in 1925.

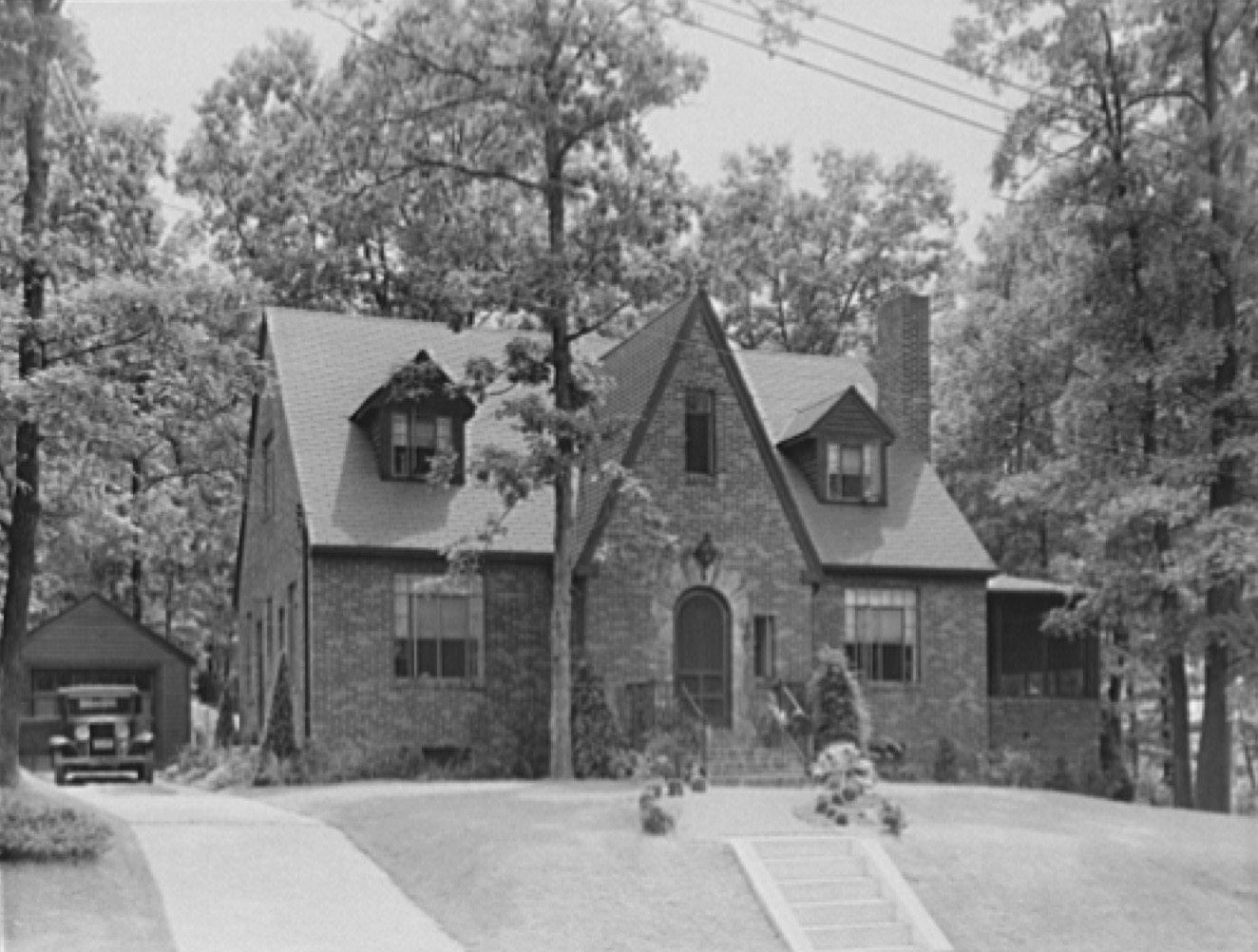
Potomac Electric Power Company House in College Park, 1938

The Berwyn neighborhood was developed beginning about 1885 adjacent to the Baltimore and Ohio Railroad. It was created by Francis Shannabrook, a Pennsylvanian who purchased a tract of land between Baltimore Avenue and the railroad tracks. Shannabrook established a small depot, built a general store, and erected approximately 15 homes in the area to attract moderate-income families looking to move out of Washington. The neighborhood began to grow after 1900 when the City and Suburban Electric Railway entered the area. By 1925, approximately 100 single-family homes existed, mostly two-story, wood-frame buildings. The community housing continued to develop in the 1930s and 1940s with one story bungalows, Cape Cods, and Victorians and, later, raised ranches and split-level homes.

The Daniels Park neighborhood was developed, beginning in 1905 on the east and west sides of the City and Suburban Electric Railway in north College Park. Daniels Park was created by Edward Daniels on 47 acres (19 ha) of land. This small residential subdivision was improved with single-family houses arranged along a grid pattern of streets. The houses—built between 1905 and the 1930s—range in style from American Foursquares to bungalows.

The Hollywood neighborhood was developed in the early 20th century along the City and Suburban Electric Railway. Edward Daniels, the developer of Daniels Park, planned the Hollywood subdivision as a northern extension of that earlier community. Development in Hollywood was slow until after World War II, when Albert Turner acquired large tracts of the northern part of the neighborhood in the late 1940s. Turner was able to develop and market brick and frame three-bedroom bungalows beginning in 1950. By 1952, an elementary school had been built. Hollywood Neighborhood Park, a 21-acre (8.5 ha) facility along the Baltimore and Ohio Railroad line, is operated by the Maryland-National Capital Park and Planning Commission.

In 1943, due to World War II efforts to conserve rail transport, the Washington Senators relocated their spring training camp to College Park. The locations of 1943 Major League Baseball spring training camps were limited to an area east of the Mississippi River and north of the Ohio River.

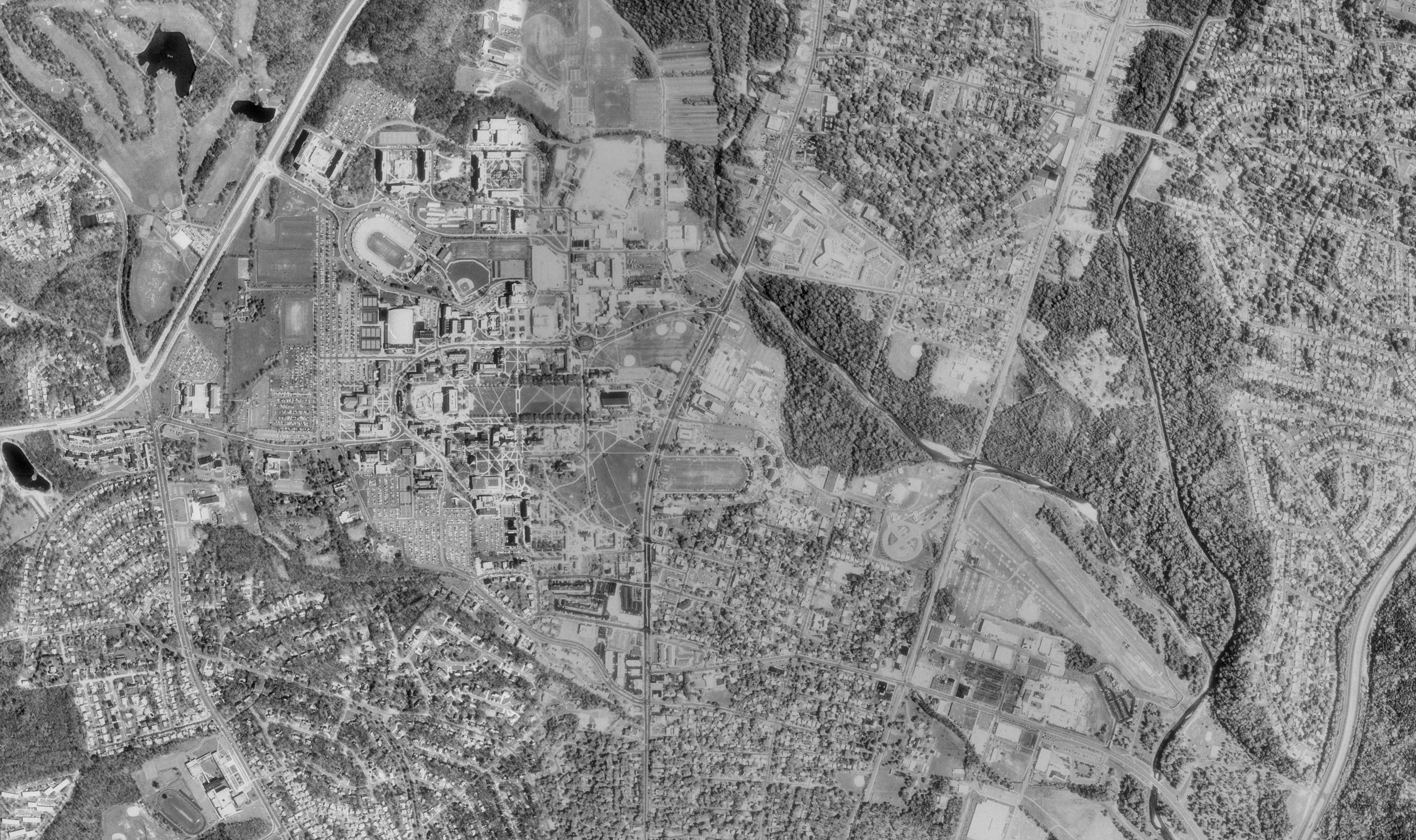
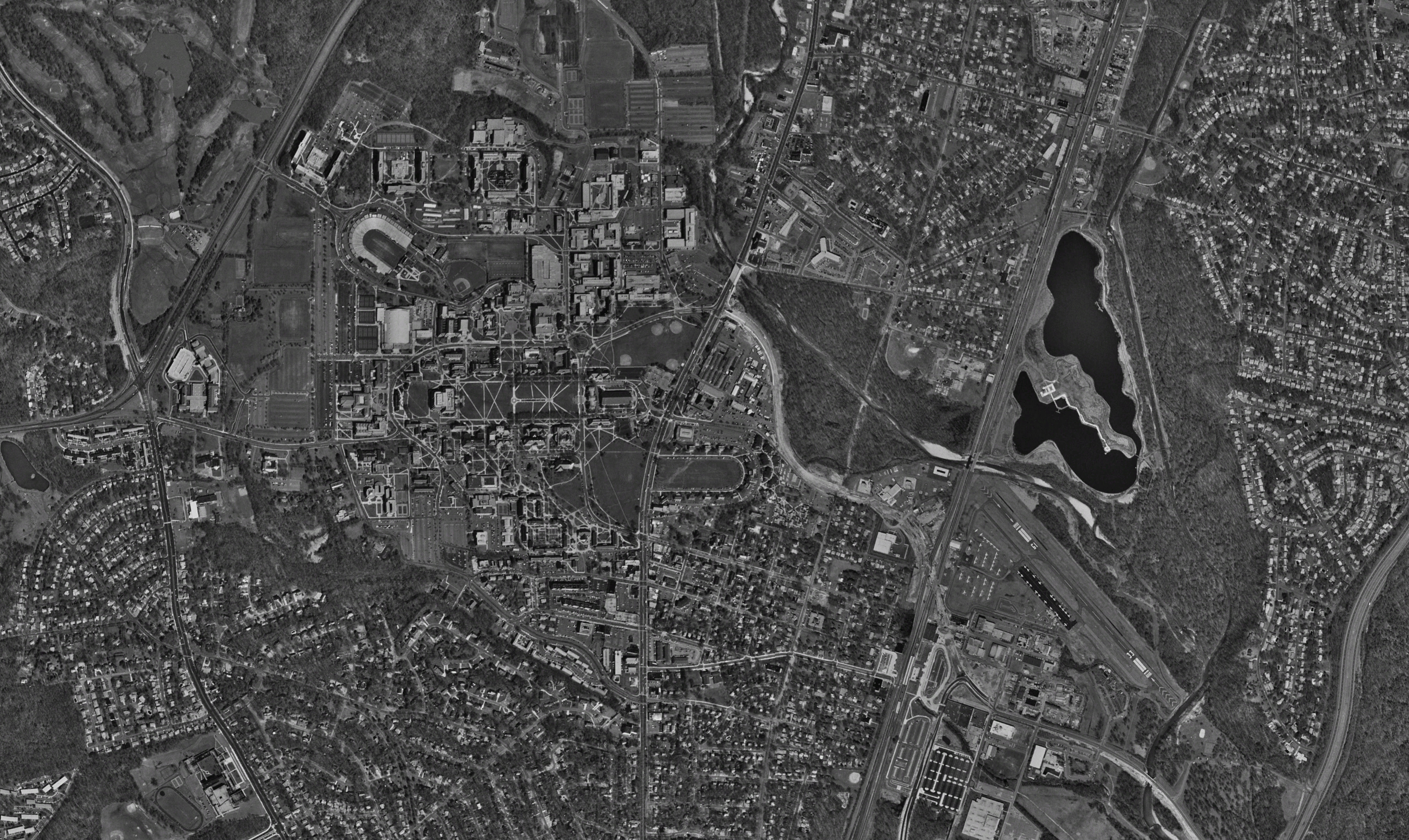
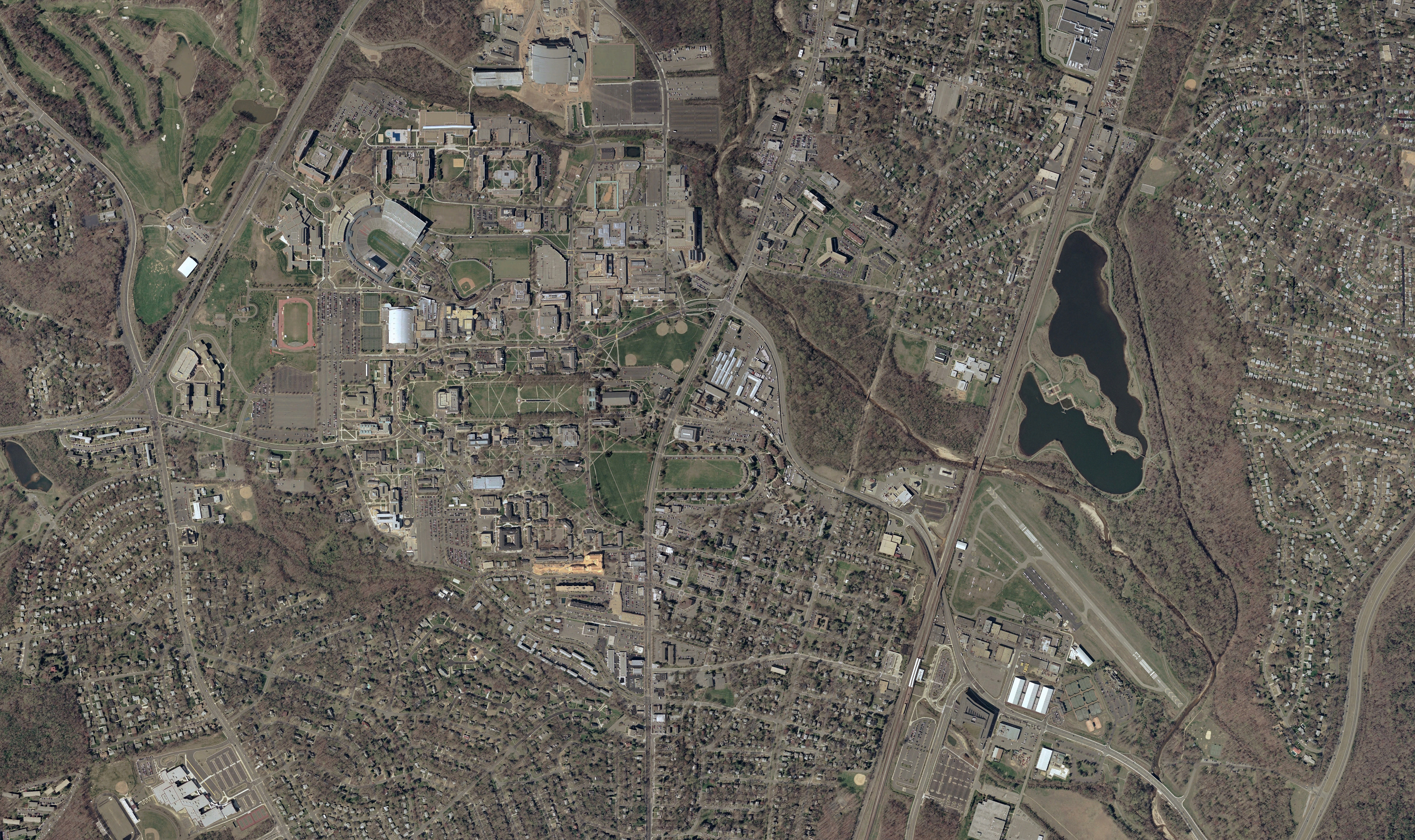
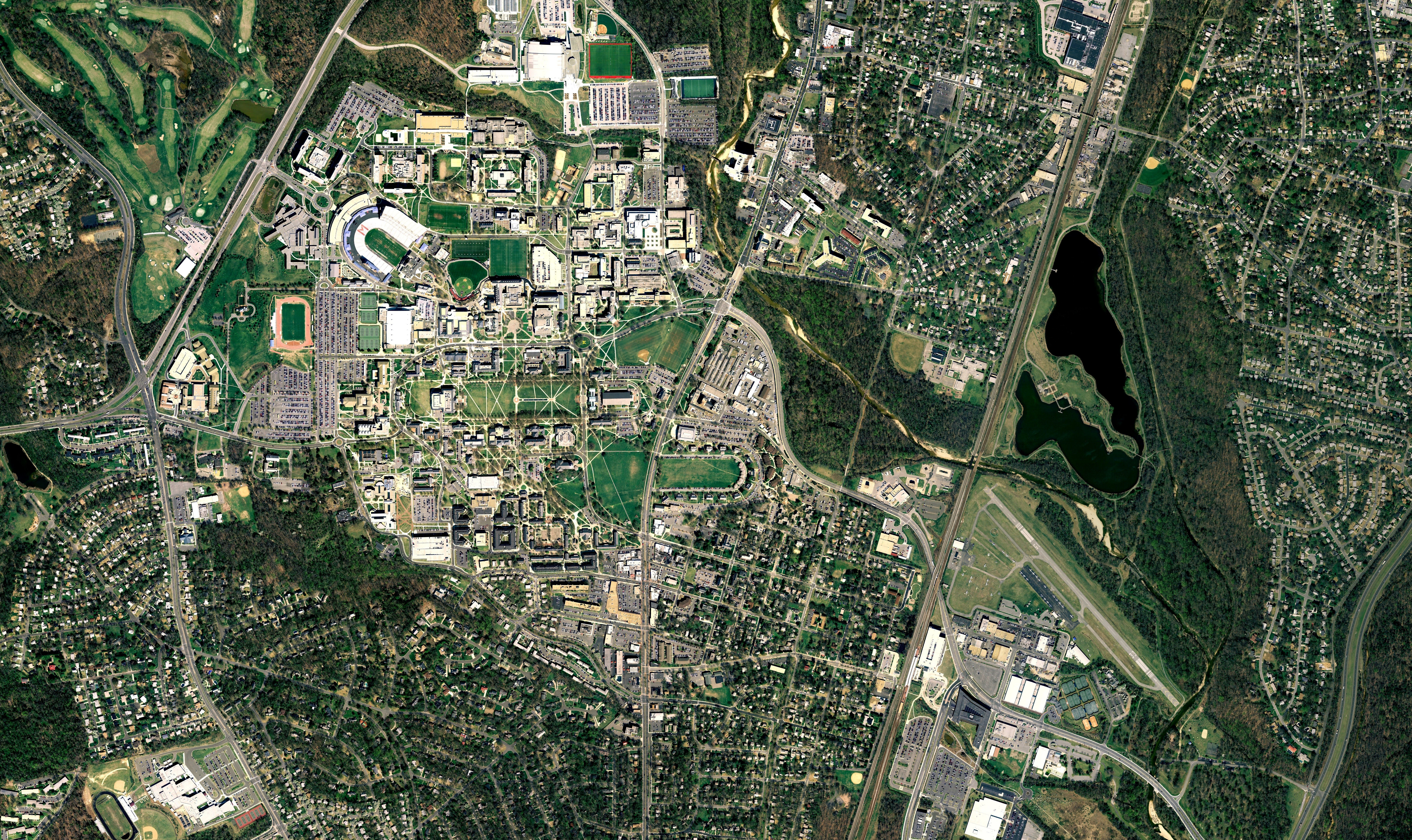
Aerial view of the evolution of downtown College Park between 1989 and 2007. Lake Artemesia can be seen on the right from 1994 onwards

During the 1960s through the 1980s an Urban Renewal Project took place within the historic African American community of Lakeland. This project was carried out in the face of the opposition of the community's residents and resulted in the redevelopment of approximately two thirds of the community. It displaced 104 of Lakeland's 150 households.

The College Park–University of Maryland station opened in 1993, connecting College Park to Washington D.C. by means of Metro. During its construction in the late 1980s, sand and gravel were excavated from the site of an adjacent small lake. In return, Metro built Lake Artemesia on the site, a large recreational area that includes aquatic gardens, fishing piers, and hiker-biker trails.

== 21st century ==
By the turn of the 21st century, College Park began experiencing significant development pressure. Both students and city residents acknowledged the city's lack of amenities and poor sense of place. In 2002, the city and county passed the Route 1 Sector Plan, which allowed and encouraged mixed use development along College Park's main roadway. In July 2006, a group of students created Rethink College Park—a community group providing a website to share information about development and to encourage public dialogue. Early mixed-used projects along Baltimore Avenue included the View I (2006) and II (2010), Mazza Grandmarc (2010), and the Varsity (2011).

Development accelerated after Wallace Loh became the president of the University of Maryland in 2010 and relations between the university and the city improved. It was recognized that the university could not compete if the students, faculty, and staff could not live in College Park so the Greater College Park initiative, a $2 billion public-private investment to revitalize the community around the university aiming to create one of the nation’s best college towns, was launched in 2014. Some of the developments that occurred as a result of this and other initiatives, include

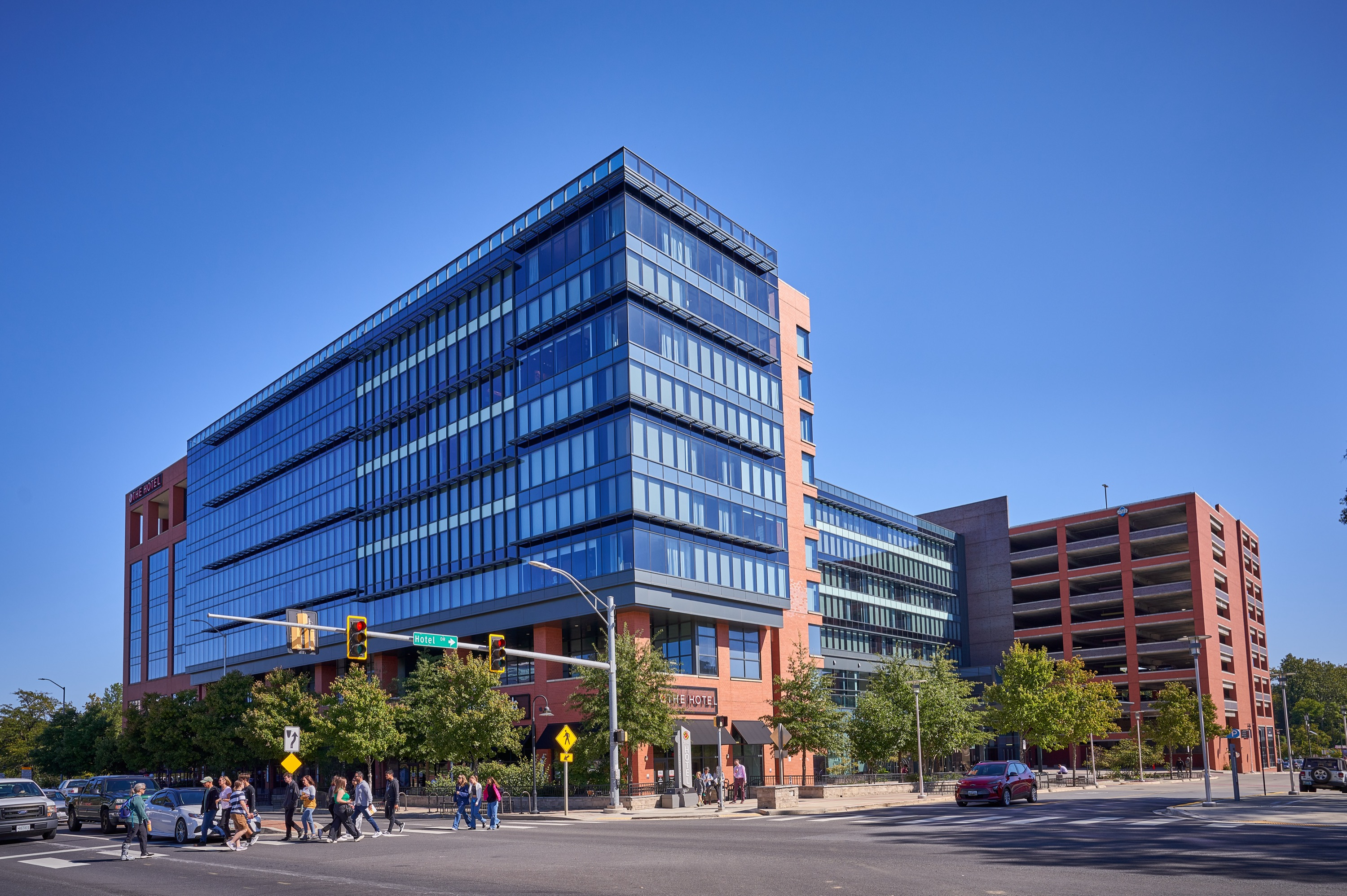
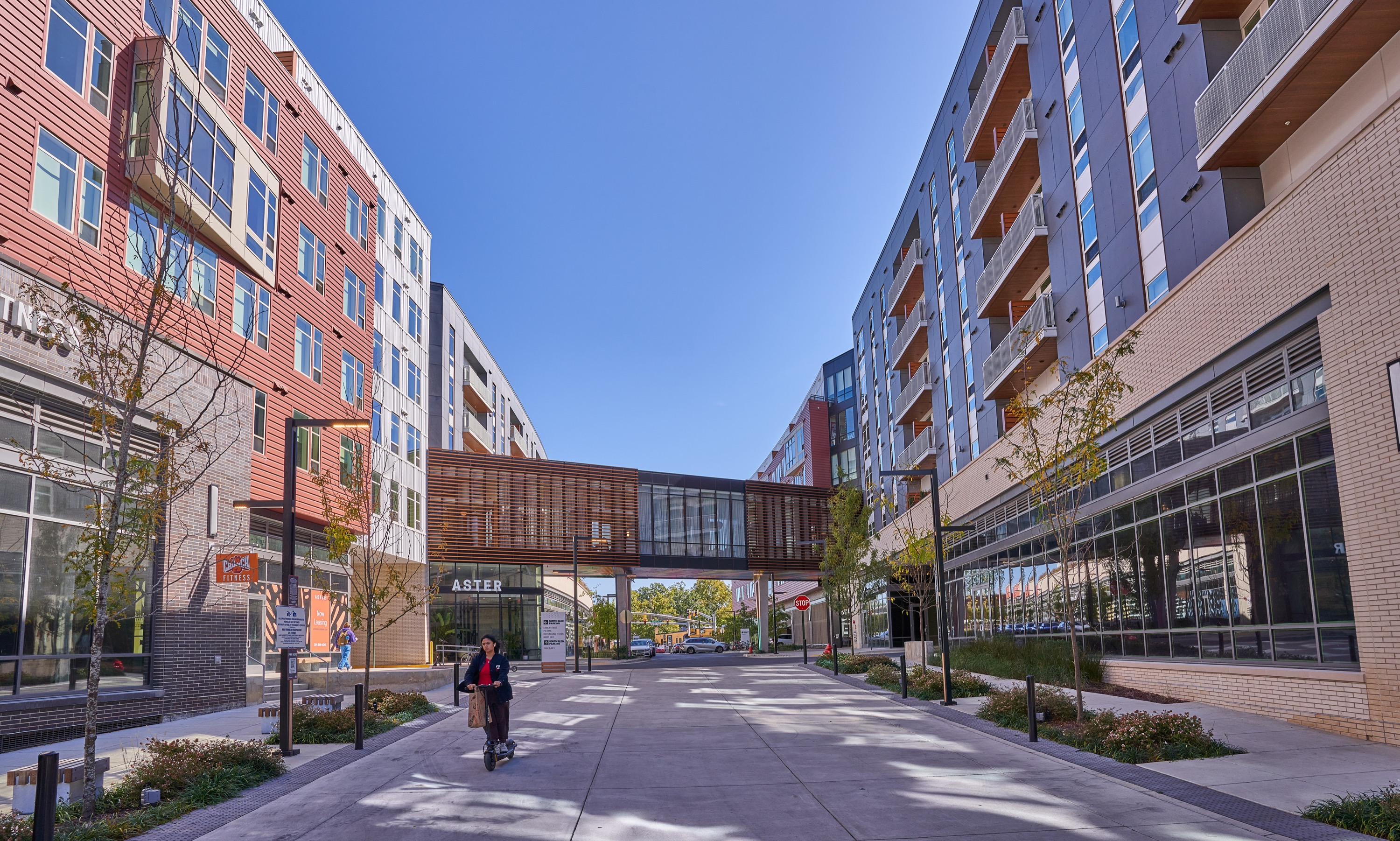
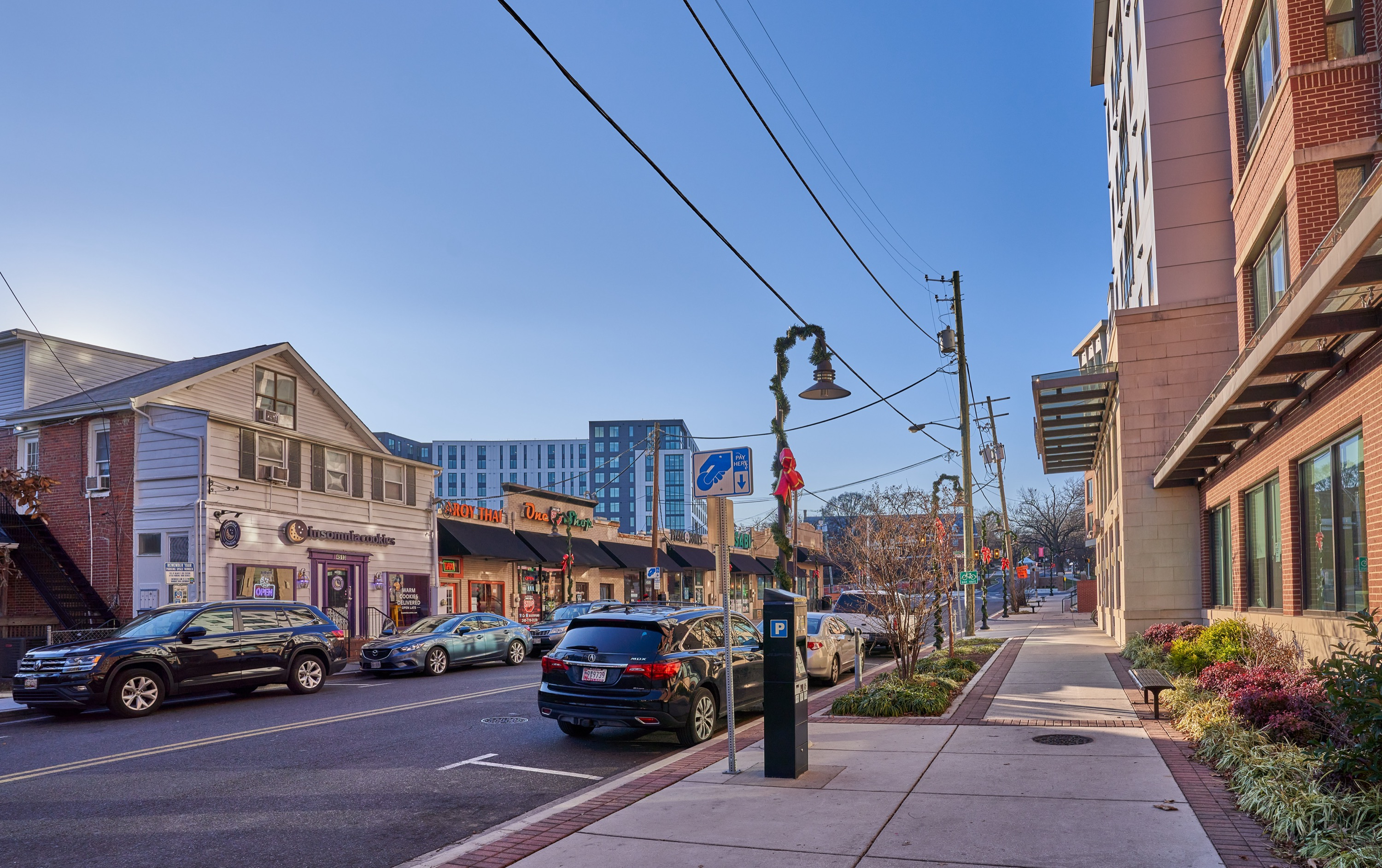
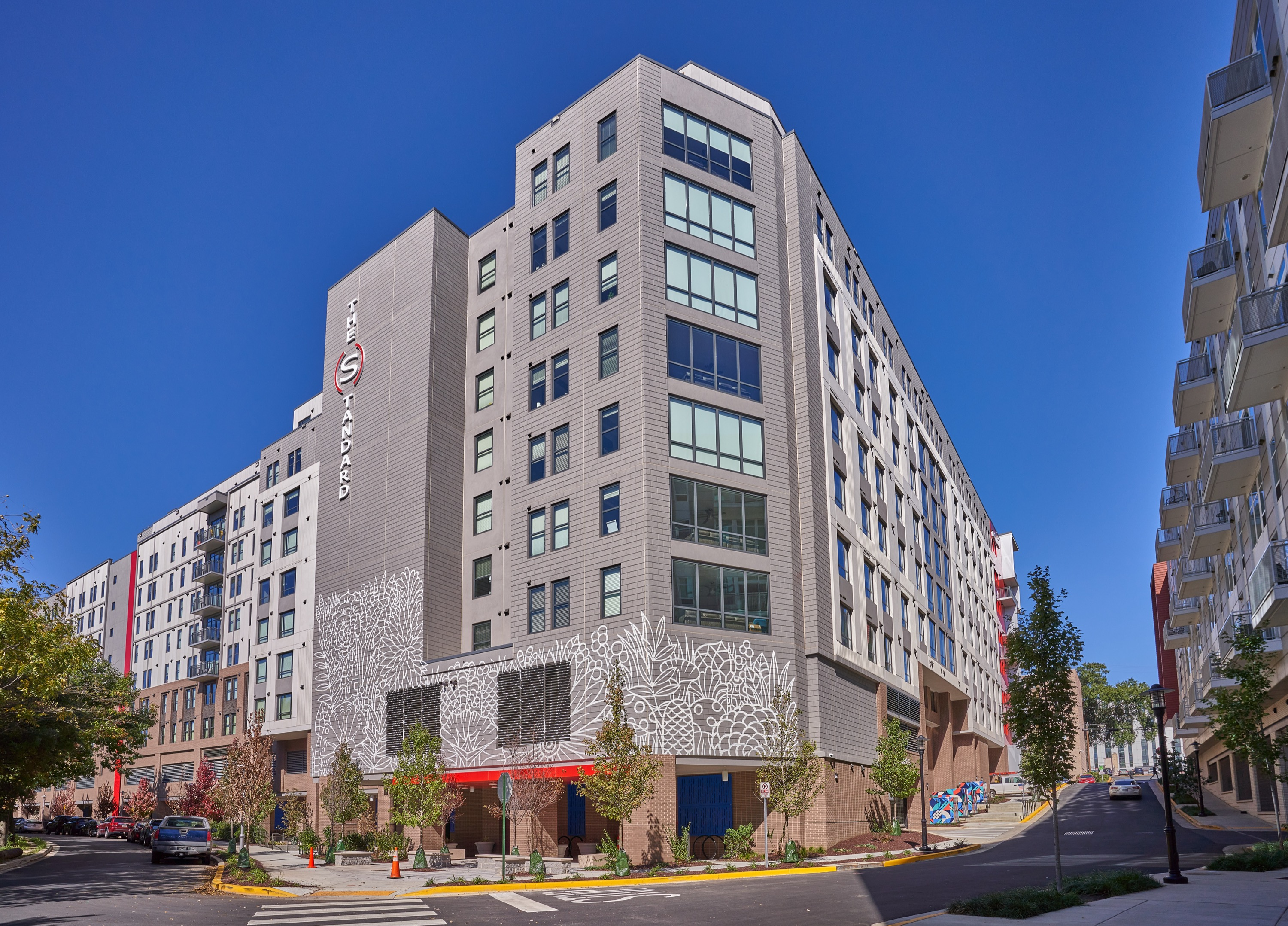
The Hotel at UMD and mixed-use projects built as part of the Greater College Park initiative
- The creation of the preparatory school College Park Academy in 2013.
- The launch of the Discovery District, the university's business and research park.
- The 4-star Hotel at UMD (2017) and the Cambria (2018), the first hotels built in the city in over half a century.
- The development of the College Park City Hall (2021), a joint venture between the city and the university providing offices for both as well as retail space and a public plaza.
- The construction of a series of mixed-used apartment high-rises such as Domain (2014), Landmark (2015), Terrapin Row (2016), Alloy (2019), Nine (2022), Tempo (2022), Aster (2022), Aspen Heights (2023), Standard (2023), or Hub (2023) that brought along key amenities such as new grocery stores.

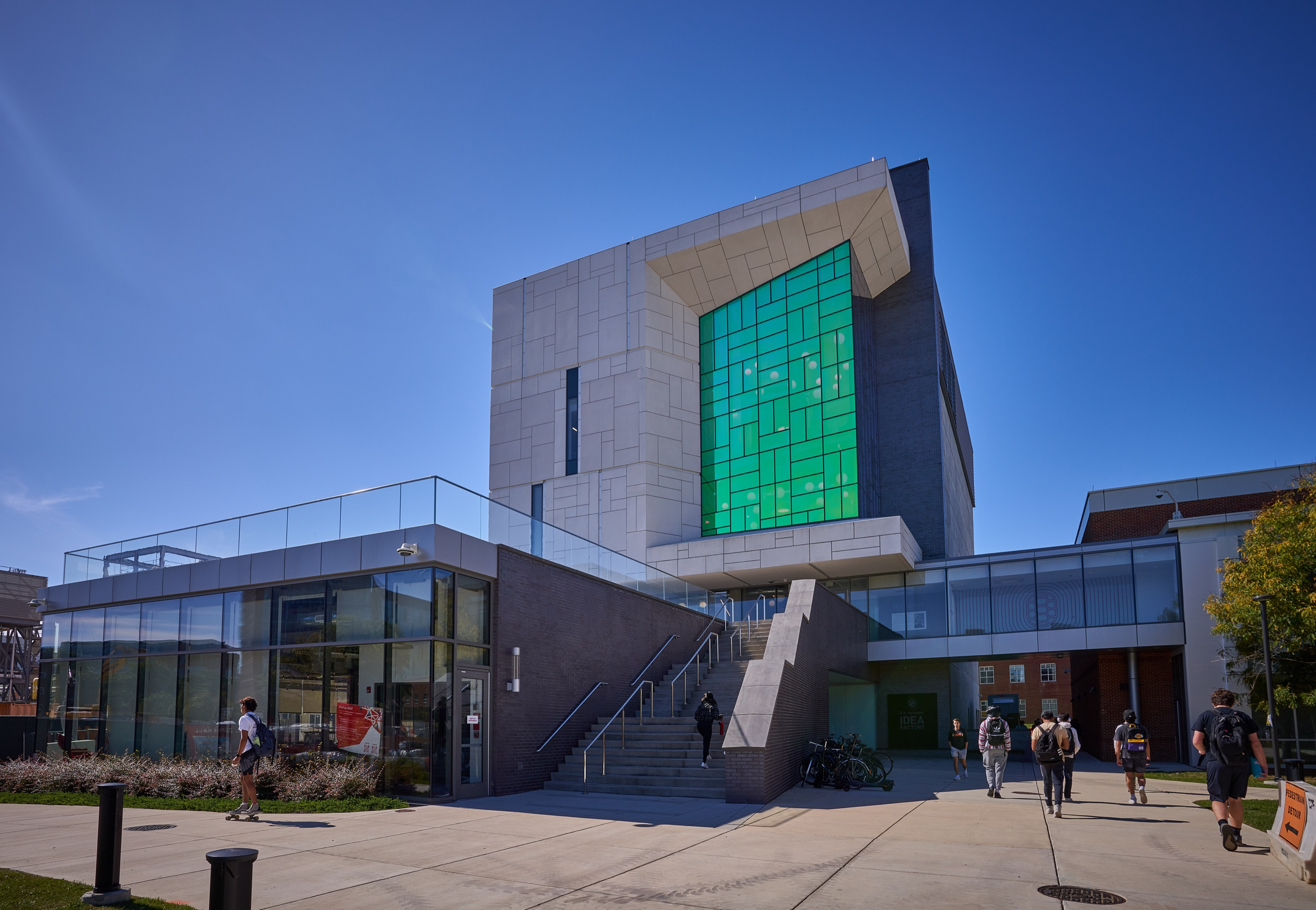
The IDEA (Innovate, Design and Engineer for America) factory at the University of Maryland College Park

This development has been complemented by two major infrastructure projects: the Purple Line, which will provide direct light-rail connections form College Park to Bethesda, Silver Spring, and New Carrolton, and the reconstruction of a portion of Baltimore Avenue into a boulevard with a planted median, new bicycle lanes, and continuous sidewalks. Additionally, the University of Maryland has added several state-of-the-art facilities on their campus, including the Iribe Center for computer science and engineering, the Thurgood Marshall Hall for the public policy school, and the IDEA factory for engineering and entrepreneurship.

On June 9, 2020, the city government passed a "Resolution of the Mayor and Council of the City of College Park Renouncing Systemic Racism and Declaring Support of Black Lives" which recognized harm done to the historic African American community of Lakeland. In it, "the Mayor and Council acknowledge and apologize for our city's past history of oppression, particularly with regards to the Lakeland community, and actively seek opportunities for accountability and truth-telling about past injustice, and aggressively seek opportunities for restorative justice".

On March 2, 2023, Patrick Wojahn, who had served as College Park's mayor since 2015, resigned after being arrested on child pornography charges. Wojahn pleaded guilty to over 100 counts and was sentenced to 150 years with 120 years suspended.

On November 8, 2023 the parking lot on the Greenbelt Metro station, adjacent to North College Park, was selected to host the future FBI headquarters. The construction of this facility is expected to further accelerate and consolidate the development of College Park.

== Historic sites ==
The following sites and districts in College Park are listed on the National Register of Historic Places.

Site name	Year	Location	Description
National Archives Archeological Site	3000-2600 B.C.	8601 Adelphi Rd.	Archeological remains from prehistoric settlements during the Late Archaic period.
Old Town College Park	1890s	Roughly bounded by Yale, & Columbia Aves., Calvert Rd., & UMD Campus.	Developed to attract commuters to Baltimore and Washington, DC, and individuals affiliated with the Maryland Agricultural College.
Calvert Hills Historic District	1890s	Roughly bounded by Calvert Rd., Bowdoin Ave., Erskine Rd., Calvert Park, Albion Rd., and Baltimore Ave.	Developed in the early part of the 20th century by members of the Calvert family.
College Park airport	1909	6709 Corporal Frank S. Scott Dr.	The oldest continuously operated airport in the world.
Marenka House	1958	7300 Radcliffe Dr	Distinctive local example of Modern Movement architecture.

Additionally there are 14 historic sites in College Park identified by the Maryland-National Capital Park and Planning Commission.

Site name	Year	Location	Description
Rossborough Inn	1803	7682 Baltimore Ave.	Owned by the Calverts of Riversdale, the inn was a popular stage-stop on the Baltimore and Washington Turnpike.
Old Parish House	1817	4711 Knox Rd.	Originally constructed as a farm building on the Calverts’ Riversdale estate, later was used as a parish hall and the headquarters of the College Park Woman’s Club.
Cory House	1891	4710 College Ave.	One of the first houses built in the 1889 subdivision of College Park.
Morrill Hall	1892	7313 Preinkert Dr.	Named for Justin Smith Morrill, a Vermont politician who wrote the first Land Grant Act.
Taliaferro House	1893	7406 Columbia Ave.	The home of Emily Taliaferro, daughter of John Oliver Johnson who developed the 1889 College Park subdivision.
Lake House	1894	8524 Potomac Ave.	Built by and for the family of Wilmot Lake, later served as the parsonage of the Berwyn Presbyterian Church.
McDonnell House	1896	7400 Dartmouth Ave.	Built for Henry B. McDonnell, the first Dean of Arts and Sciences of the University of Maryland.
Baker-Holliday House	1907	5005 Huron St.	Built for Annie and Robert Baker.
Bowers-Sargent House	1909	9312 Rhode Island Ave.	One of the early dwellings built in the 1906 subdivision of Daniels Park.
LaValle House	1910	5013 Huron St.	Built for the family of George H. LaValle, operators of a locally well-known florist business. It was one of the early houses to be built in the 1906 subdivision of Daniels Park.
Calvert Hall	1913	7551 Calvert Service Ln.	Named after Charles B. Calvert, a key figure in the founding of the Maryland Agricultural College.
Buck-Singleton House	1915	4908 Hollywood Rd.	First house built in the Hollywood-On-The-Hill subdivision.
Holbrook House	1927	4618 College Ave.	Built for the William A. Holbrook family.
Lakeland School	1928	8108 54th Ave.	Second secondary school for African-Americans in the county.

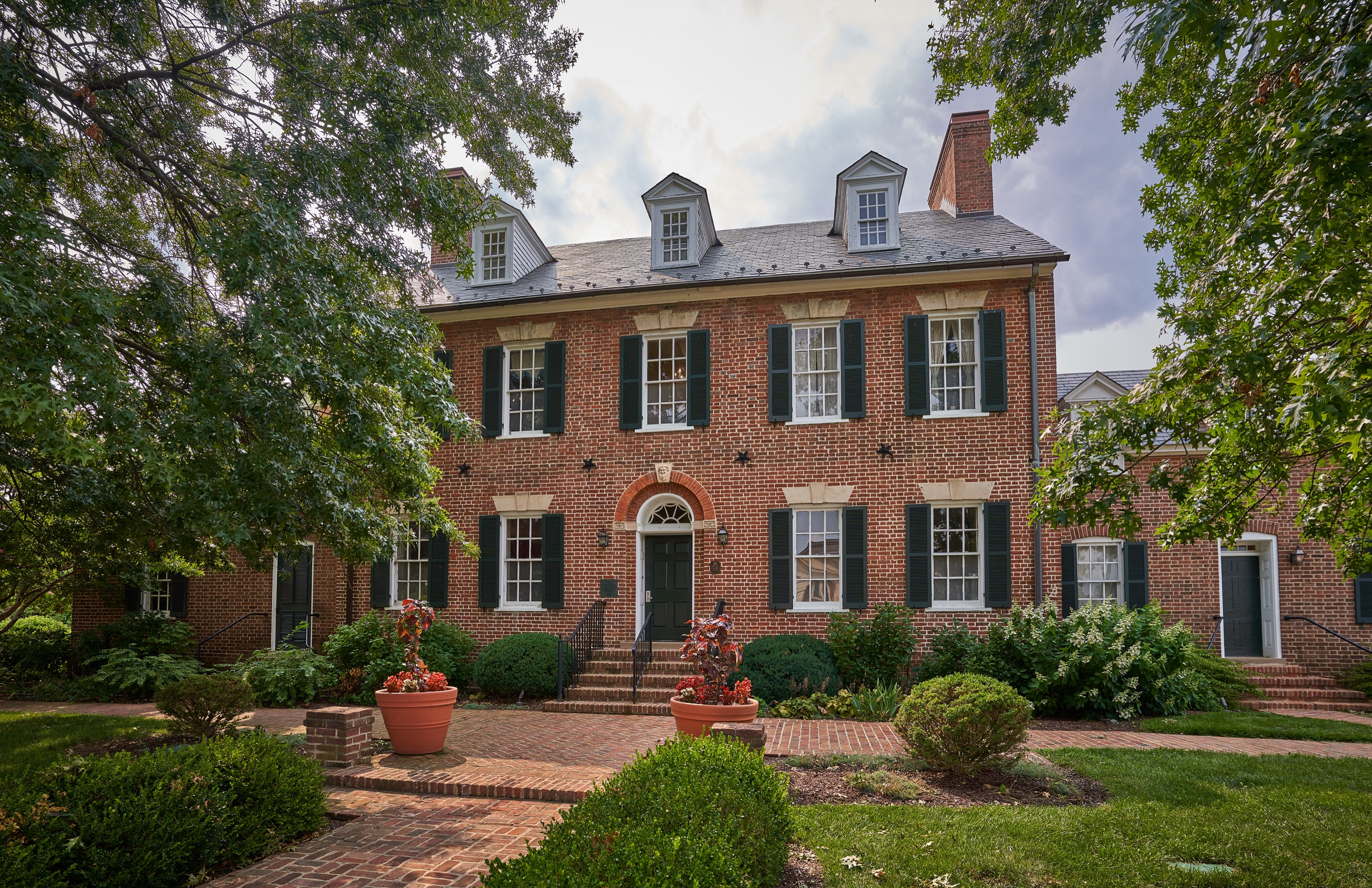
The Rossborough Inn (1803), oldest standing building in College Park

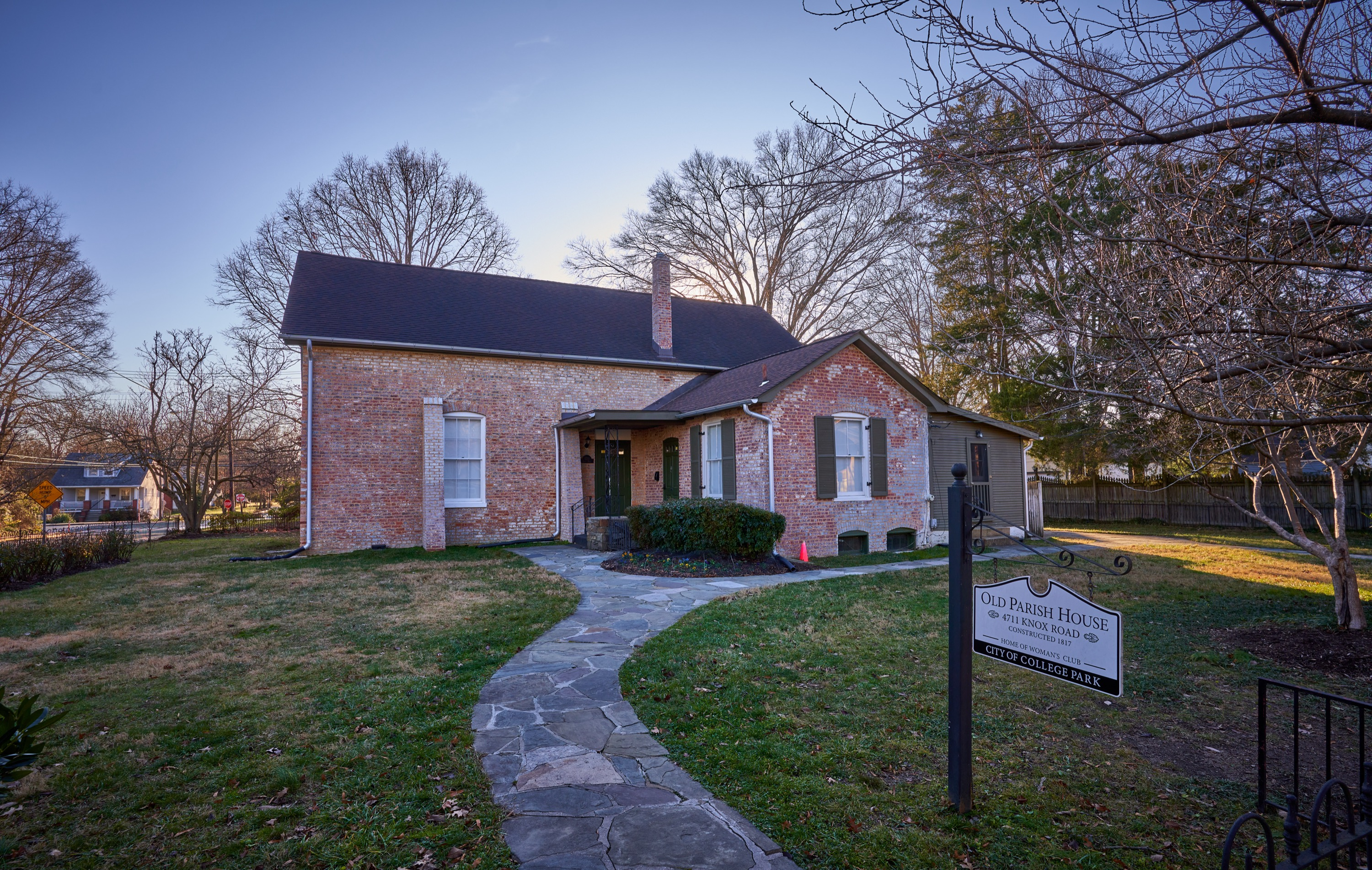
The Old Parish House, built in 1817

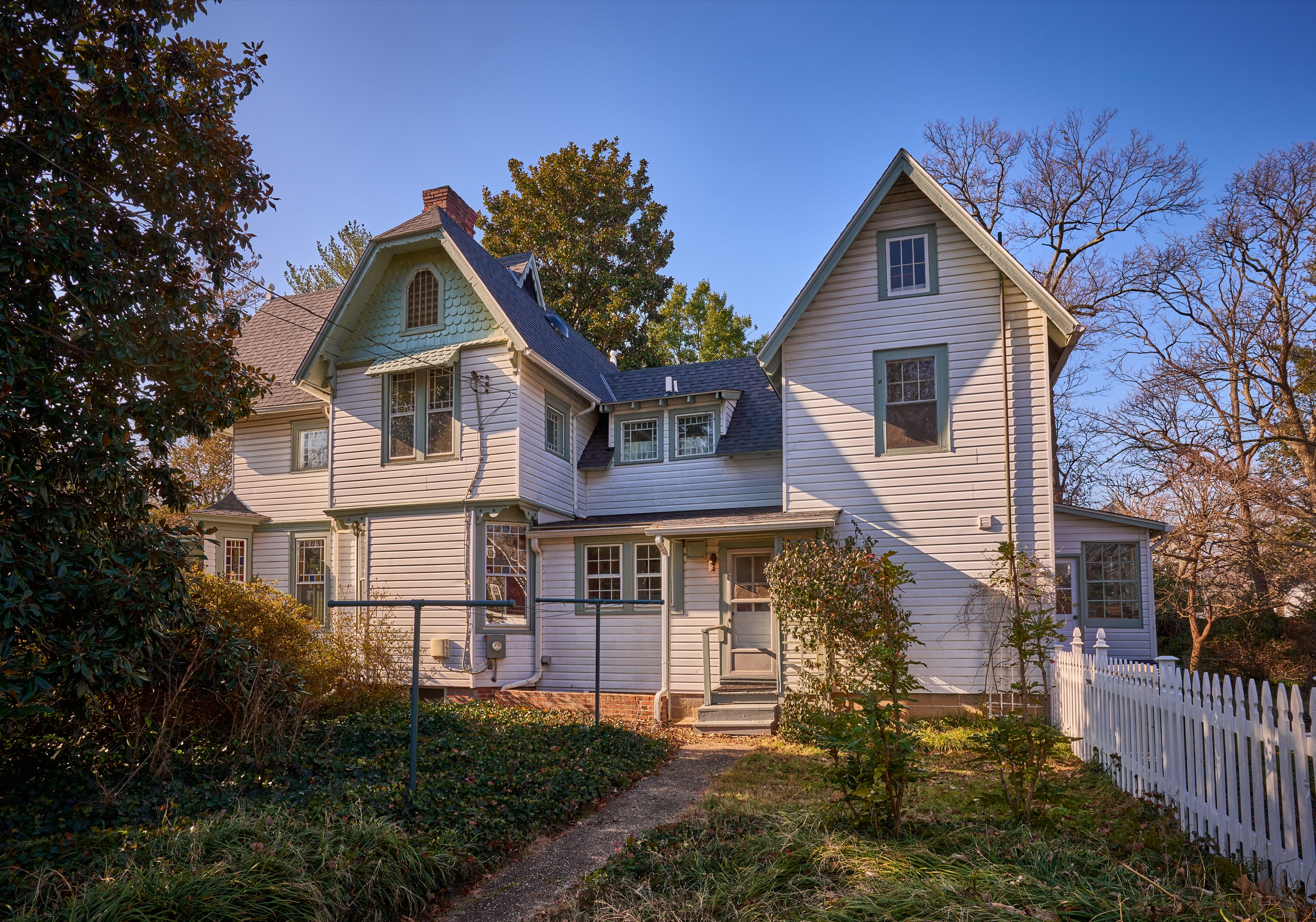
The Cory House, built in 1891

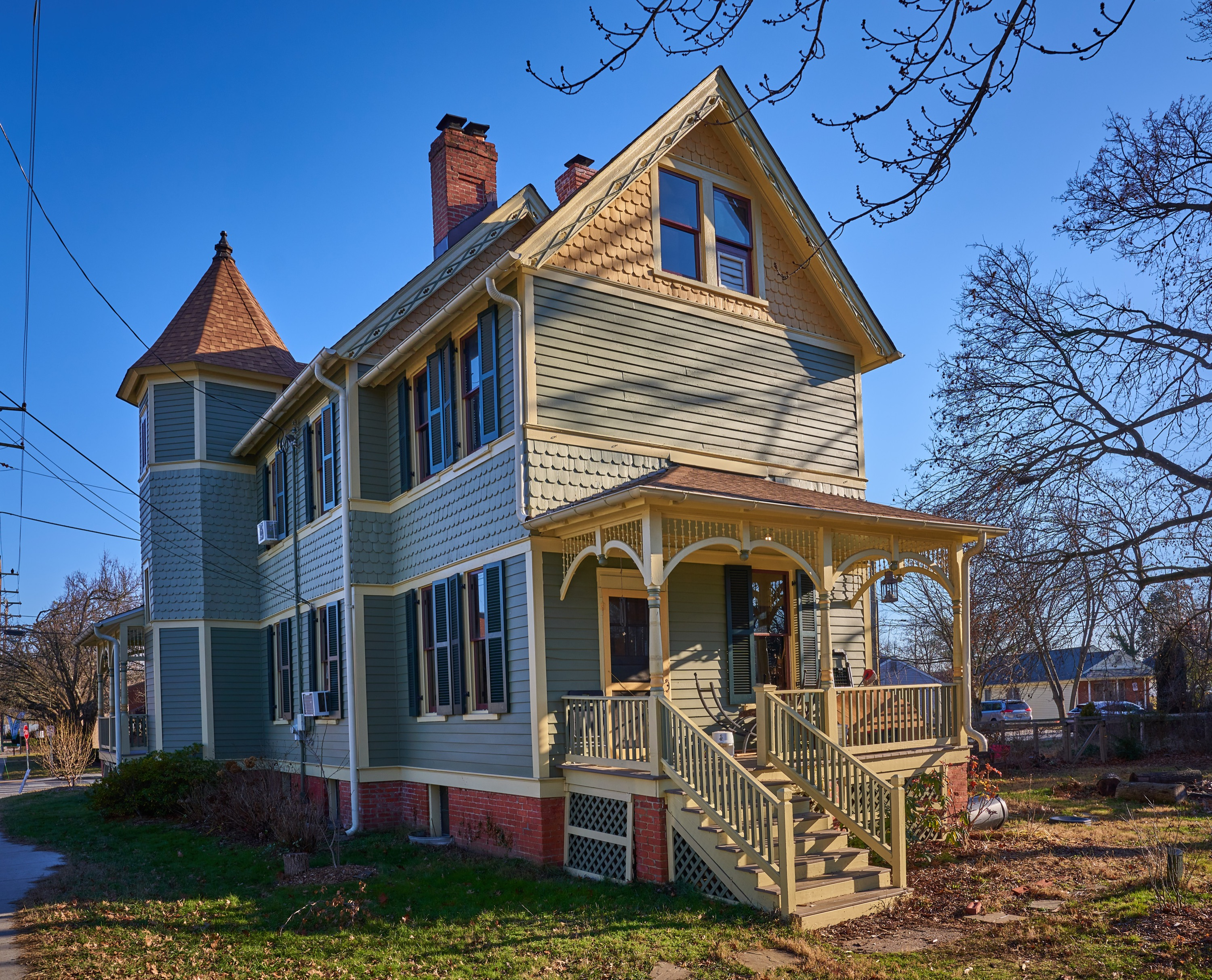
The Lake House, built in 1894

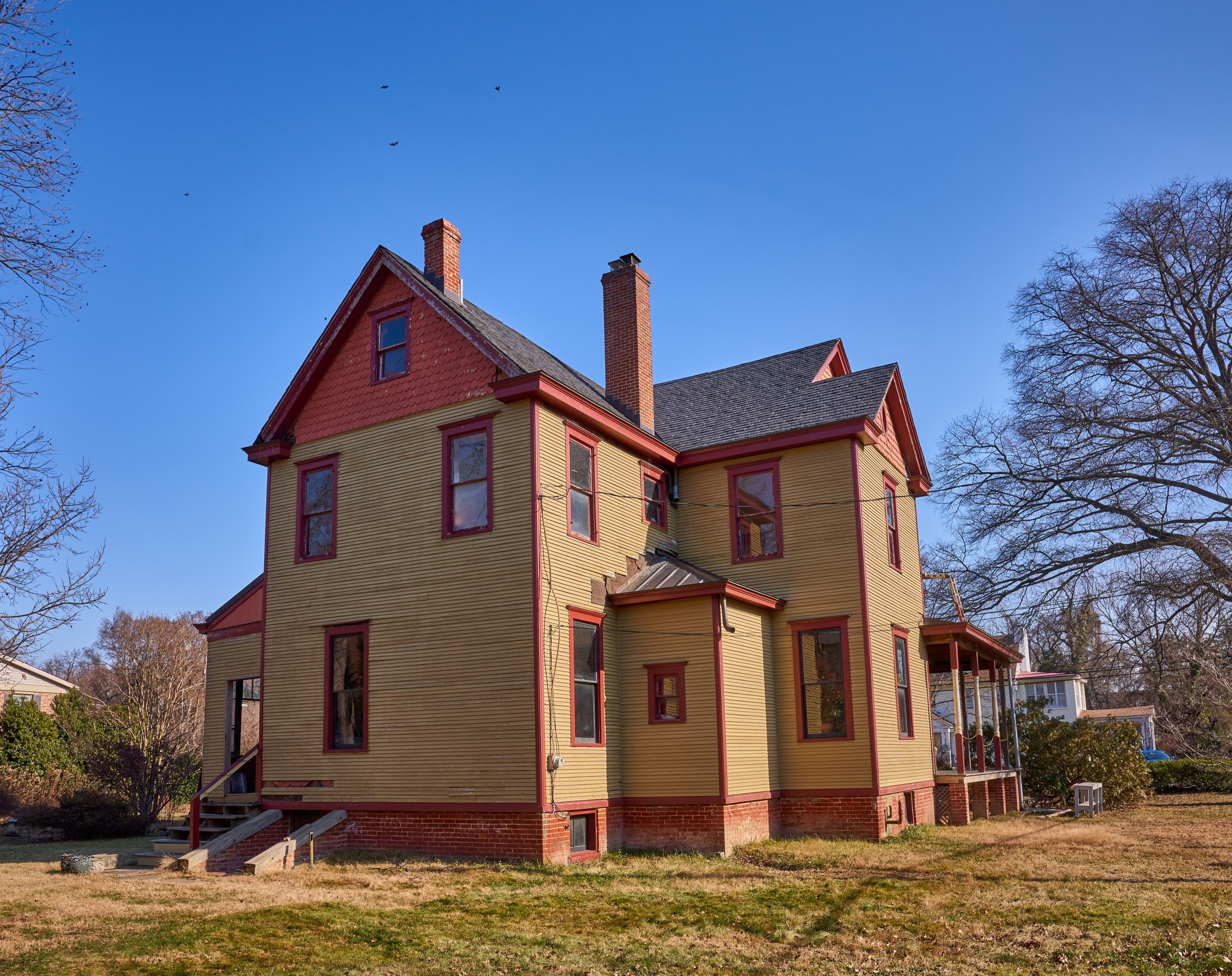
The McDonnell House, built in 1896
