= Cory House =

Cory House may refer to:

- Cory House (College Park, Maryland)
- Miller-Cory House, Westfield, New Jersey, listed on the National Register of Historic Places (NRHP)
- Ambrose Cory House, Fostoria, Ohio, NRHP-listed in Seneca County
