= Ghosts of the American Civil War =

Ghostlore

Tales of ghosts from the American Civil War have been popularly shared since its end. Among the locales that have become known for Civil War ghost stories are the Sharpsburg battlefield near Sharpsburg, Maryland; the Chickamauga battlefield in Georgia; Harper's Ferry, West Virginia; Buras, Louisiana; and Warren, Arkansas.

== Gettysburg ==
The Battle of Gettysburg was the largest battle in North America. It has many ghost stories. The Soldiers' Orphanage cellar is said to make psychics too afraid to enter the house, due to its legend. The Herr Tavern was built in 1815, but during the battle it was used as the first Confederate hospital at Gettysburg, where amputations often resulted in limbs being thrown out through the window to be collected later, only for many of the soldiers to die afterward. As a result, four of the guest rooms are said to be haunted, and the rooms are numbered so that there is no room 13.

The interest in ghosts and Gettysburg remains to the present day. In recent times, people have claimed to have seen ghost soldiers, and sometimes even ghost battles, in many places around Gettysburg, Pennsylvania. Eight separate companies offer ghost tours in Gettysburg—some seasonally, and some all year.

A book, Ghosts of Gettysburg: Spirits, Apparitions and Haunted Places of the Battlefield, by Mark Nesbitt, detailed the reports of ghostly apparitions in the area where the Battle of Gettysburg took place in July 1863.

== Other battlefields ==
A battle did not need to be major for ghosts stories to be made about it. A farmhouse in northern Georgia is claimed to be haunted by a ghost associated with The Battle of Kolb Farm.

One of the bloodiest battles was the Battle of Sharpsburg. Tales of Union and Confederate ghost sightings exist, that are reportedly seen placing and firing at each other with artillery on the battlefield.

== Lincoln's ghost ==
Abraham Lincoln, who is said to haunt the White House

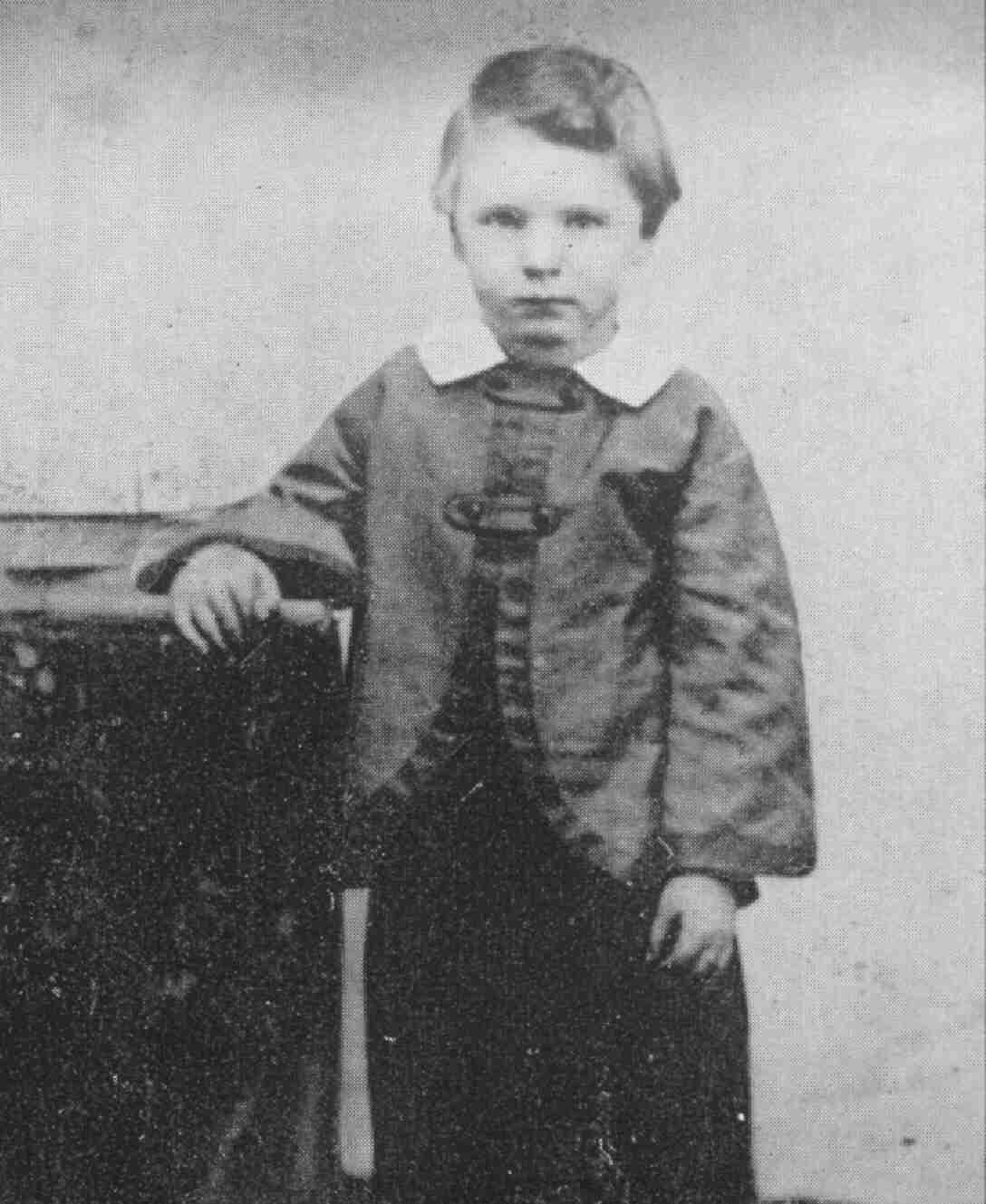
Willie Lincoln, who died in the White House during his father's presidency

Abraham Lincoln has long been said to haunt the White House. First Lady Grace Coolidge, wife of President Calvin Coolidge, was the first to claim to spot Lincoln's ghost. She claimed to see Lincoln looking at the Potomac River sadly from the Oval Office. Carl Sandburg claimed to have "sensed" Lincoln do the same as well. Both Queen Wilhelmina of the Netherlands and Eleanor Roosevelt allegedly saw Lincoln's ghost during World War II in the Lincoln Bedroom (Lincoln's office during the war); the Queen admitted to fainting after seeing Lincoln in his top hat. Margaret Truman heard a tapping sound attributed to the ghost so often that Harry Truman ordered the White House renovated. Gerald Ford's daughter Susan Ford made a point of never sleeping in the Lincoln Bedroom, out of fear of Lincoln's ghost. Maureen Reagan claimed to see Lincoln's ghost in the Lincoln Bedroom as well during the administration of her father, Ronald Reagan. Others who have sensed or reportedly seen Lincoln's ghost were Harry Truman and Fala. Lincoln's ghost was reportedly seen outside of the White House as well. In Loundonville, New York, Lincoln's ghost was said to haunt a house that was owned by a woman who was present at Ford's Theatre when Lincoln was shot by John Wilkes Booth. Other Lincoln hauntings included his grave in Springfield, Illinois, a portrait of Mary Todd Lincoln and a phantom train on nights in April along the same path his funeral train followed from Washington, D.C. to Springfield.

The last sighting of Lincoln's ghost was in the early 1980s, when Tony Savoy, White House operations foreman, came into the White House and saw Lincoln sitting in a chair at the top of some stairs.

Lincoln's son Willie died during Lincoln's presidency. A White House maid during Ulysses S. Grant's administration reported seeing the ghost of the dead boy.

== Elsewhere ==
The Beauregard-Keyes House in New Orleans is said to be haunted by the ghost of Confederate general P.G.T. Beauregard and an entire regiment of ghost soldiers reenacting the Battle of Shiloh, perhaps Beauregard's worst defeat and a battle that took place 415 miles away in southwest Tennessee.

Fort Davidson Battlefield in Pilot Knob, Missouri is said to have some activity such as hearing cannons going off in the middle of the night, and spirits and shadows of soldiers walking or running by. This has been confirmed by multiple Civil War reenactors.

The Rossborough Inn on the University of Maryland campus is said to be haunted by a Confederate soldier who camped on the college grounds, a man who lost a duel in front of the Inn, and most famously, Miss Bettie, who managed the Inn during the Civil War. The Inn served as the headquarters of Confederate Army General Bradley Tyler Johnson and his cavalry brigade in 1864, while the nearby campus was occupied by both Union and Confederate soldiers.

== See also ==
- List of ghosts

== Literature ==
- Coleman, Christopher K. Ghosts and Haunts of the Civil War (Nashville: Routledge Hill Press, 1998).
- Coleman, Christopher K. The Paranormal Presidency of Abraham Lincoln (Atglen, PA: Schiffer, 2012).
- Nesbitt, Mark Ghosts of Gettysburg Vols. I-VIII (Gettysburg: self published).
- Roberts, Nancy Civil War Ghosts and Legends (Columbia, SC: Univ. SC Press, 1992).
