= Marenka House =

Historic house in Maryland, United States

- U.S. National Register of Historic Places
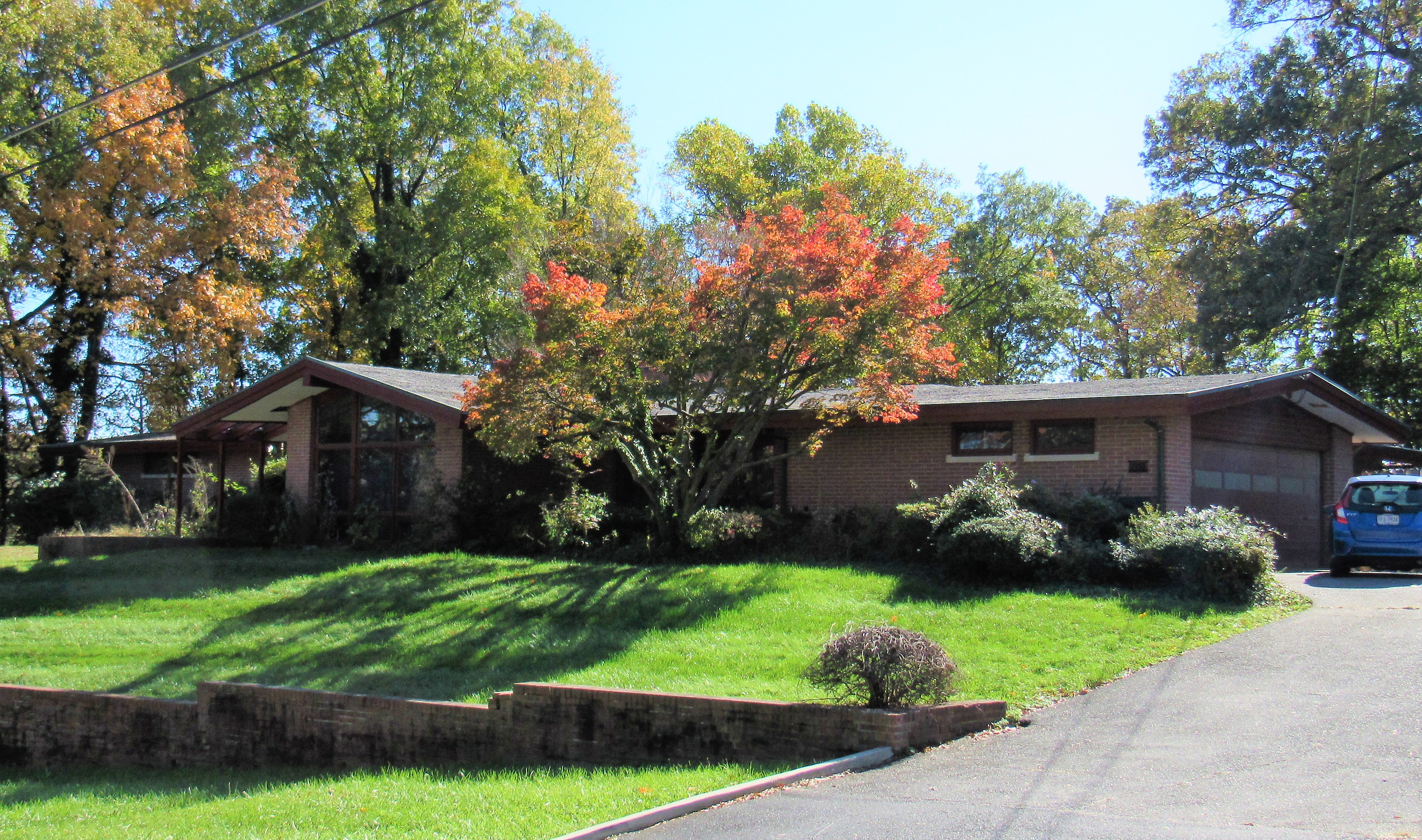

- Location within Maryland Location within the United States
- Location: 7300 Radcliffe Dr., College Park, Maryland
- Coordinates: 38°58′34″N 76°54′50″W
- Area: 1 acre (0.40 ha)
- Built: 1958
- Architectural style: Mid-Century Modern
- NRHP reference No.: 100001581
- Added to NRHP: September 18, 2017

The Marenka House is a historic house at 7300 Radcliffe Drive in College Park, Maryland. Built in 1958, it is a distinctive local example of Modern Movement architecture. It is a single-story brick structure in a basically rectangular form, with a broad low-pitch gabled roof. It has projecting gable sections to the north and south, and an integrated garage. The front projecting gable has floor-to-ceiling windows in its center, and a deep projecting eave. Although its architect is unknown, it is considered one of the area's finest Mid-Century Modern houses, an application of Frank Lloyd Wright's principles of organic architecture.

The house was listed on the National Register of Historic Places in 2017.
