= National Archives Archeological Site (College Park, Maryland) =

- National Archives Site
- U.S. National Register of Historic Places
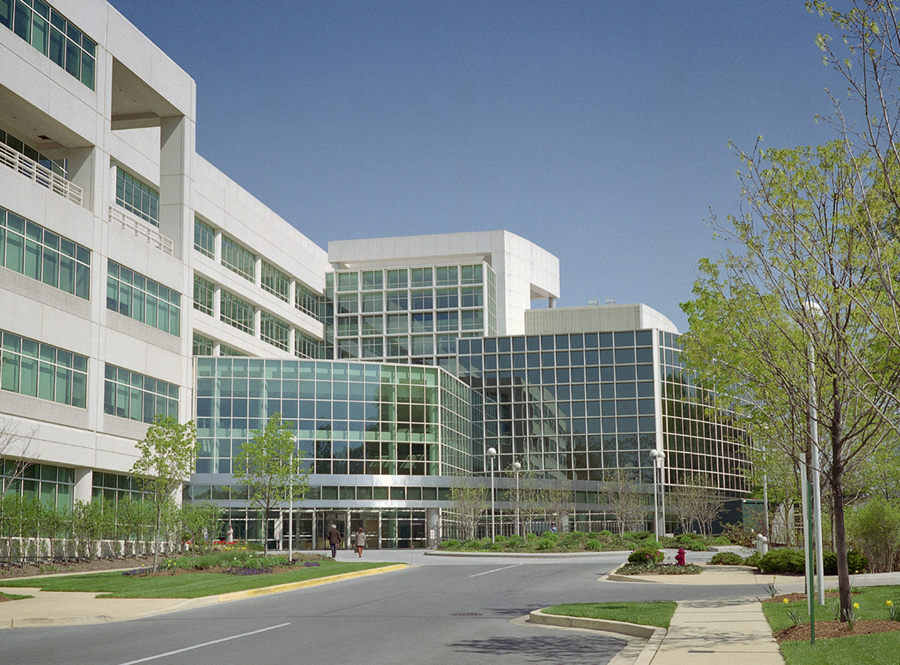
- National Archives at College Park

- Location within Maryland Location within the United States
- Nearest city: College Park, Maryland
- NRHP reference No.: 96000901
- Added to NRHP: August 22, 1996

The National Archives Site is an archaeological site at the National Archives facility in College Park, Prince George's County, Maryland. The site contains archaeological remains from prehistoric settlements during the Late Archaic period, c. 4000–1500 BC. Stone artifacts recovered through archaeological testing indicate that this camp served as a place of stone tool manufacture and probably as a staging point for hunting and foraging. Physical integrity of the prehistoric component is high, with little plow disturbance or admixture with artifacts from other periods. The presence of a small number of other artifacts, including the projectile points, a spokeshave, and utilized flakes, indicates that the site also served in other hunting and foraging pursuits. It is one of a relatively small percentage of known prehistoric properties in Maryland with undisturbed archaeological deposits.

It was listed on the National Register of Historic Places on August 22, 1996.
