= Old Parish House (College Park, Maryland) =

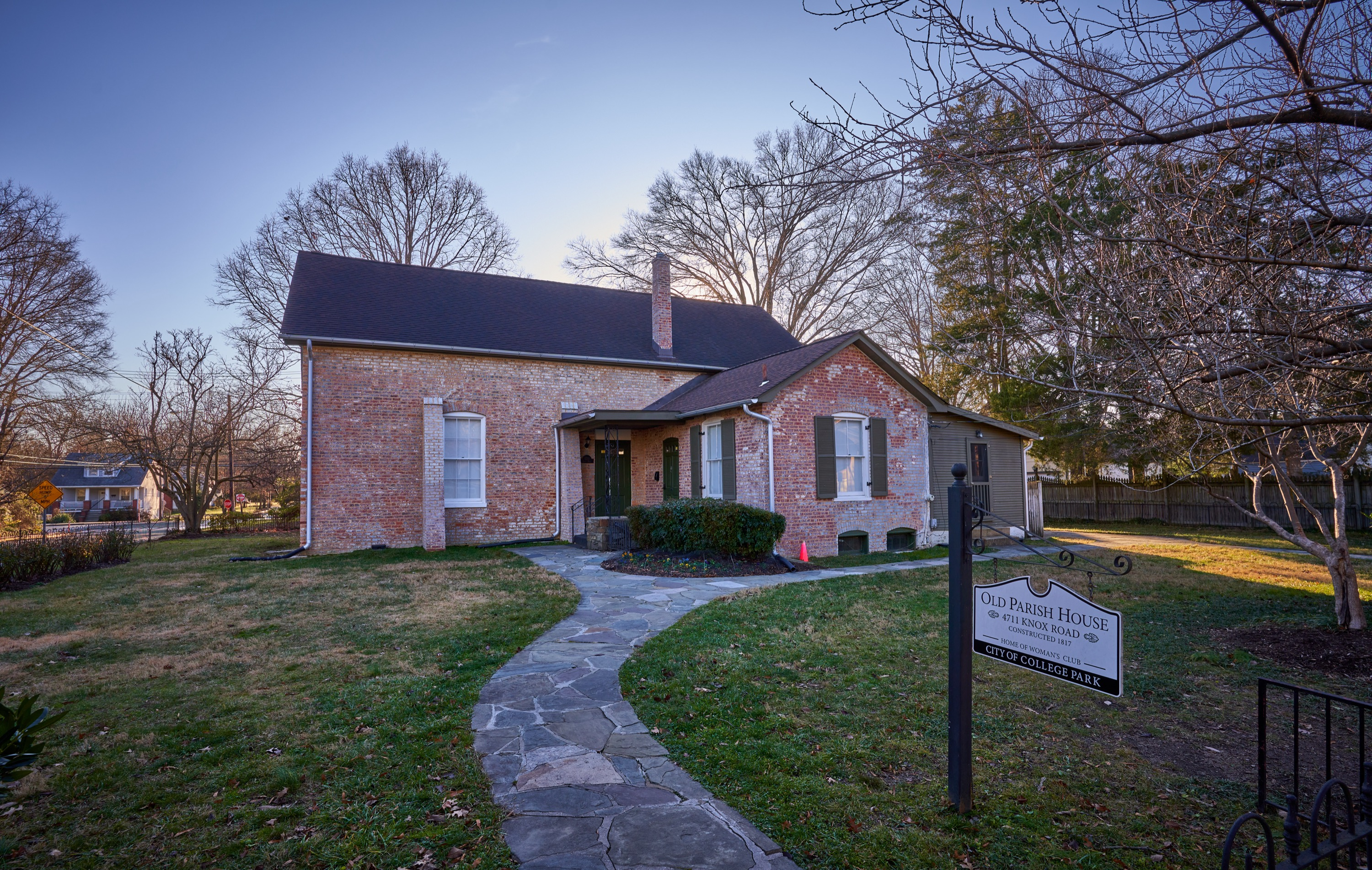

- Location within Maryland
- Alternative names: College Park Woman’s Club

General information
- Location: 4711 Knox Road, College Park, MD, United States
- Coordinates: 38°58′45″N 76°55′52″W
- Completed: 1817
- Owner: City of College Park

The Old Parish House, built in 1817, is a historic building in College Park, Maryland. The house is a registered Prince George's County Historic Site and is one of only two surviving buildings of the Riversdale estate. It is currently owned by the City of College Park and is used as a public meeting place and rented for special events.

== History ==
The Old Parish House was initially a dairy barn for the Calvert's family Riversdale estate. Since 1872 it served as a church, and after the St. Andrew's church building was completed in 1930, as a parish hall. The St. Andrew's church building has a stained glass window in the foyer commemorating the gift of the Old Parish House to the congregation in 1892.

In 1957 it was purchased by the College Park Woman's club and used as their headquarters. In 1998 it was sold to the city of College Park and made into a public meeting and special events site.

== Architecture ==
It is one-story high with a gable roof, segmented arched windows and side walls supported by brick buttresses that were added after 1912. Major renovations were completed in 2021. These included the repair and replacement of the roof, ceilings, and windows, as well as the removal of the paint on the exterior masonry followed by the cleaning, repairing, and replacing of bricks and mortar.
