= College Park City Hall =

Official seat of government of College Park, Maryland, US

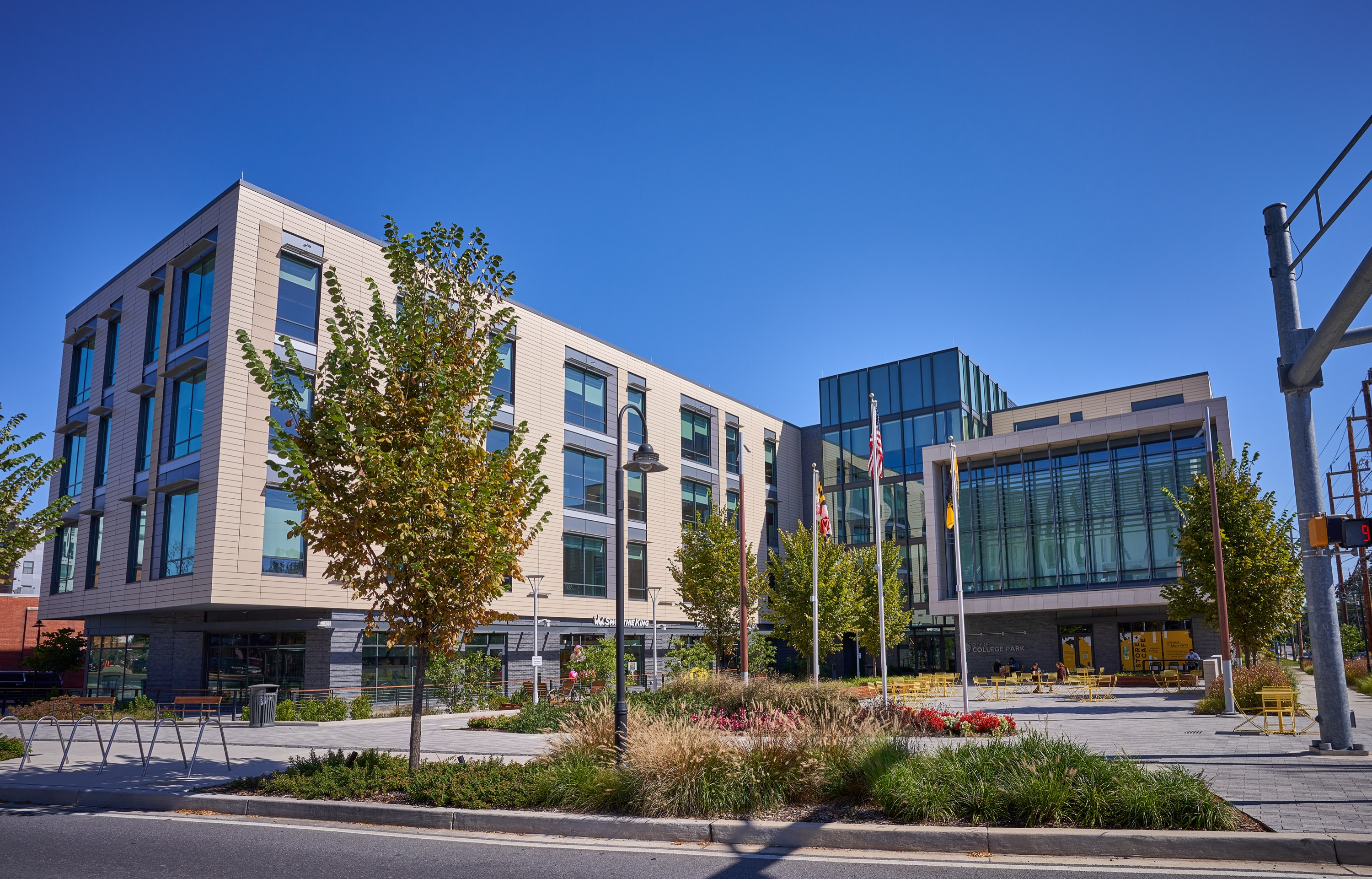
- Interactive map of the College Park City Hall area

General information
- Location: 7401 Baltimore Avenue, College Park, Maryland
- Coordinates: 38°58′51″N 76°56′14″W
- Completed: December 2021

Design and construction
- Architect: Design Collective
- Awards and prizes: Government/Public Building MidAtlantic best projects

College Park City Hall is the official seat of government of the City of College Park, Maryland. The City Hall houses the offices of the Mayor and those of the City Council of College Park as well as various city departments, agencies and boards/commissions.

The current building, the second city hall since the city's incorporation in 1945, was completed in 2021 and played a key role in the revitalization of College Park's downtown. The premises combine municipal services, University of Maryland offices, retail space and a large public plaza.

== History ==
By the end of the 20th century, College Park residents and city officials started discussing the need to replace the old city hall. The old building, inaugurated in 1959, could not meet the increased demand for city services as College Park developed, leading to hallways and corridors being used as office and storage space and city departments being spread across several different buildings.

In 2014 the city selected the existing site as the location to build the replacement building. Two additional properties on the same block were acquired and the land was pooled with lots owned by the University of Maryland to redevelop the whole block.

The project broke ground in February 2020 and was completed in December 2021. It was recognized with the MidAtlantic Best Projects award of merit for a government/public building and an Honorable Mention by the AIA Baltimore Design Awards.

== Facilities ==
The building is four stories tall and it initially dedicates 33,000 square feet for the city government offices, council chambers, an atrium and community meeting space, 45,000 square feet for the University of Maryland offices, and 7,000 square feet of retail space on the ground floor. The council chambers have a nine-foot seal that is visible from outside the building and can be lit up.

The building is organized around a large landscaped public plaza that provides seating and tables for retail customers and the general public. This plaza holds music performances, markets, and city events throughout the year that have contributed towards the revitalization of College Park's downtown.

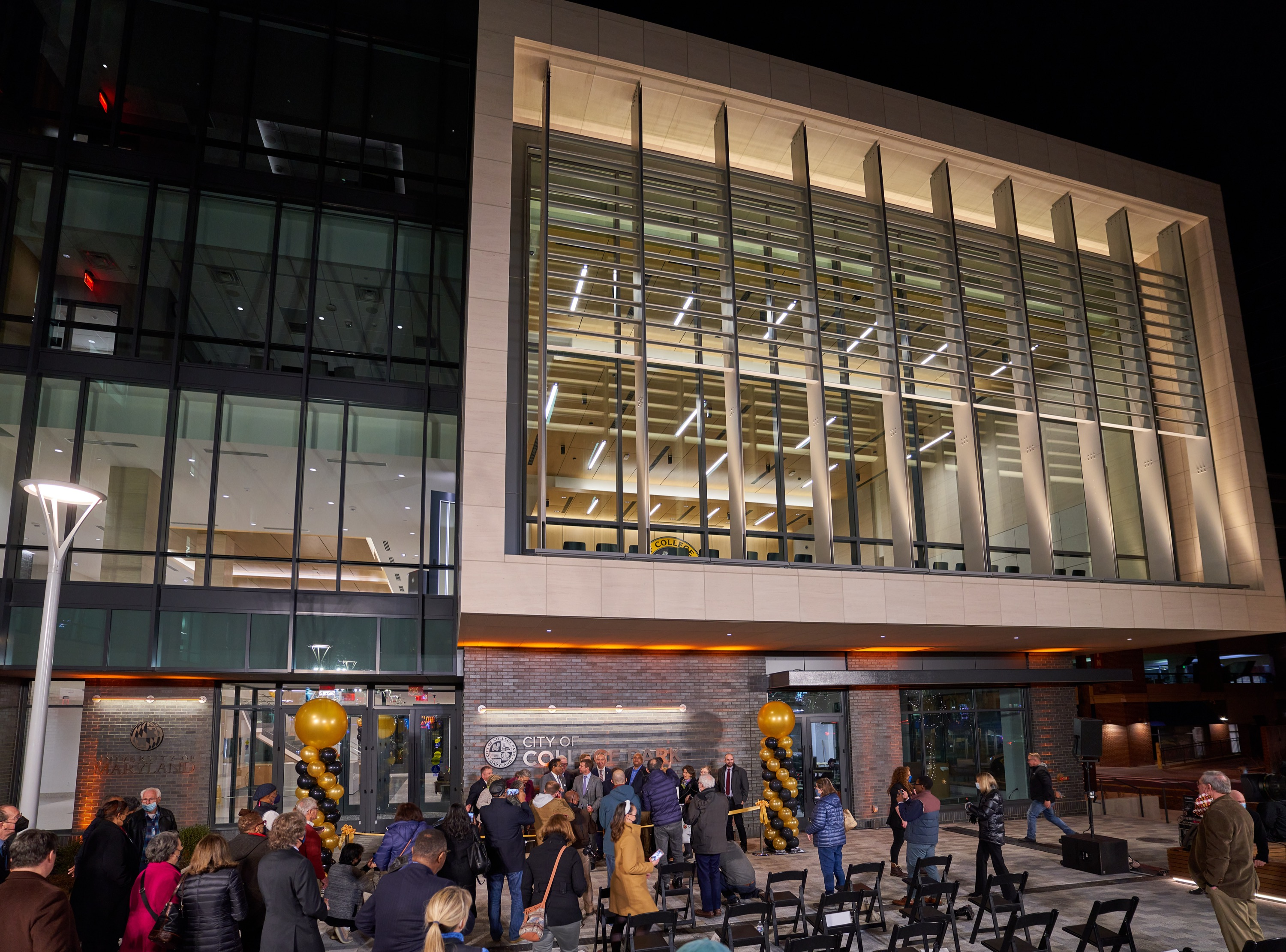
College Park City Hall ribbon cutting in December 2021

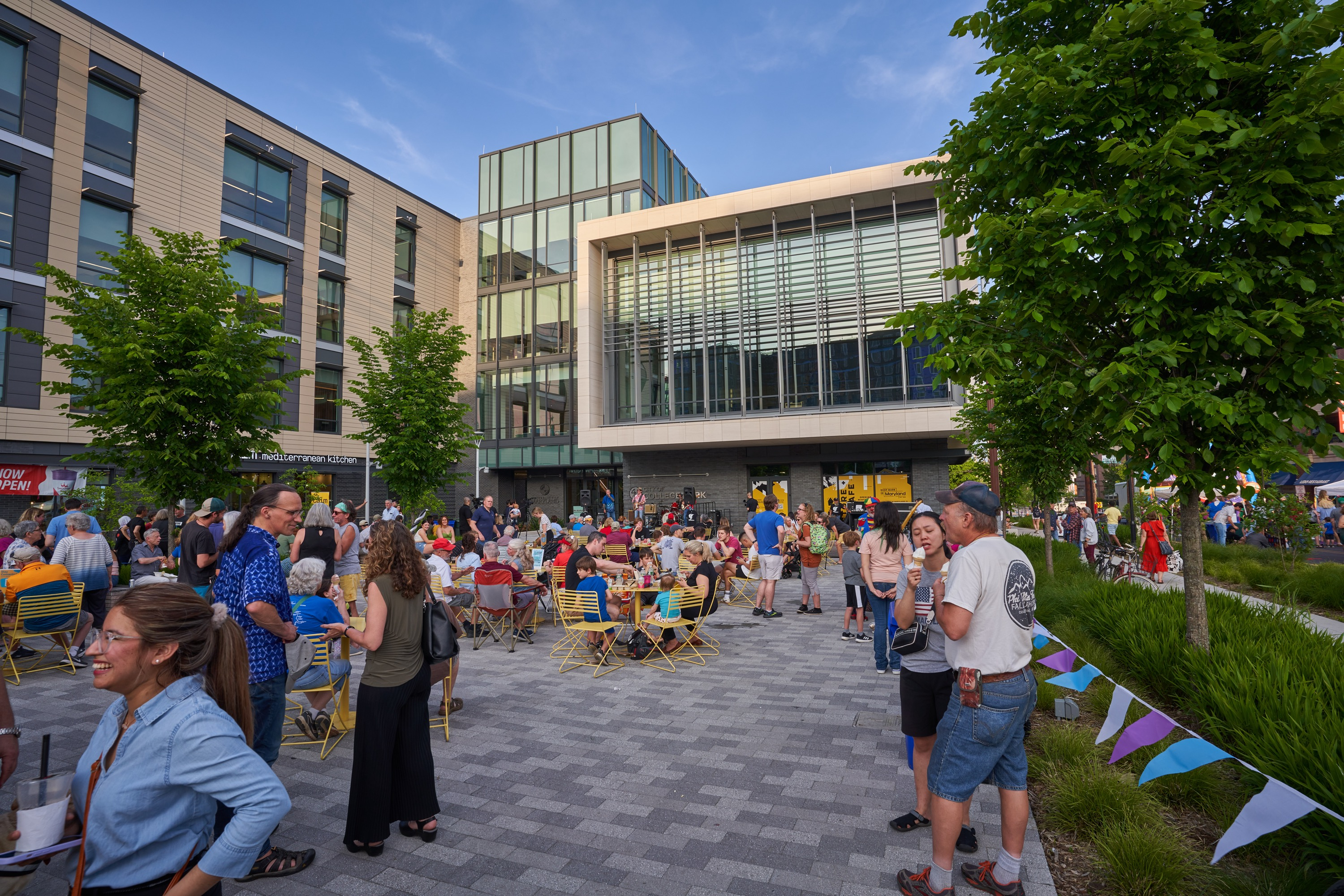
Friday Night Life! 2023 during a musical performance

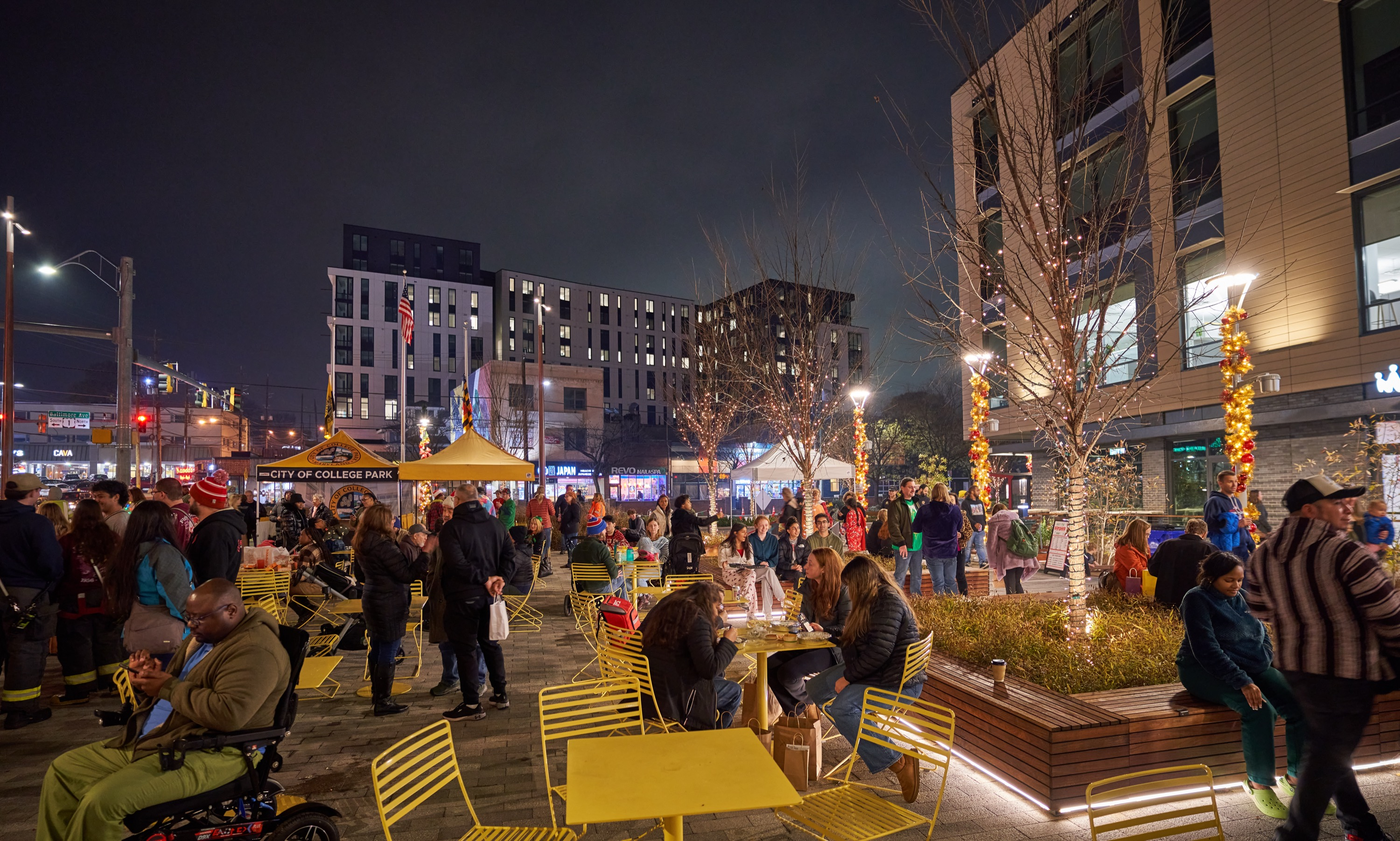
City hall plaza facing Baltimore Avenue

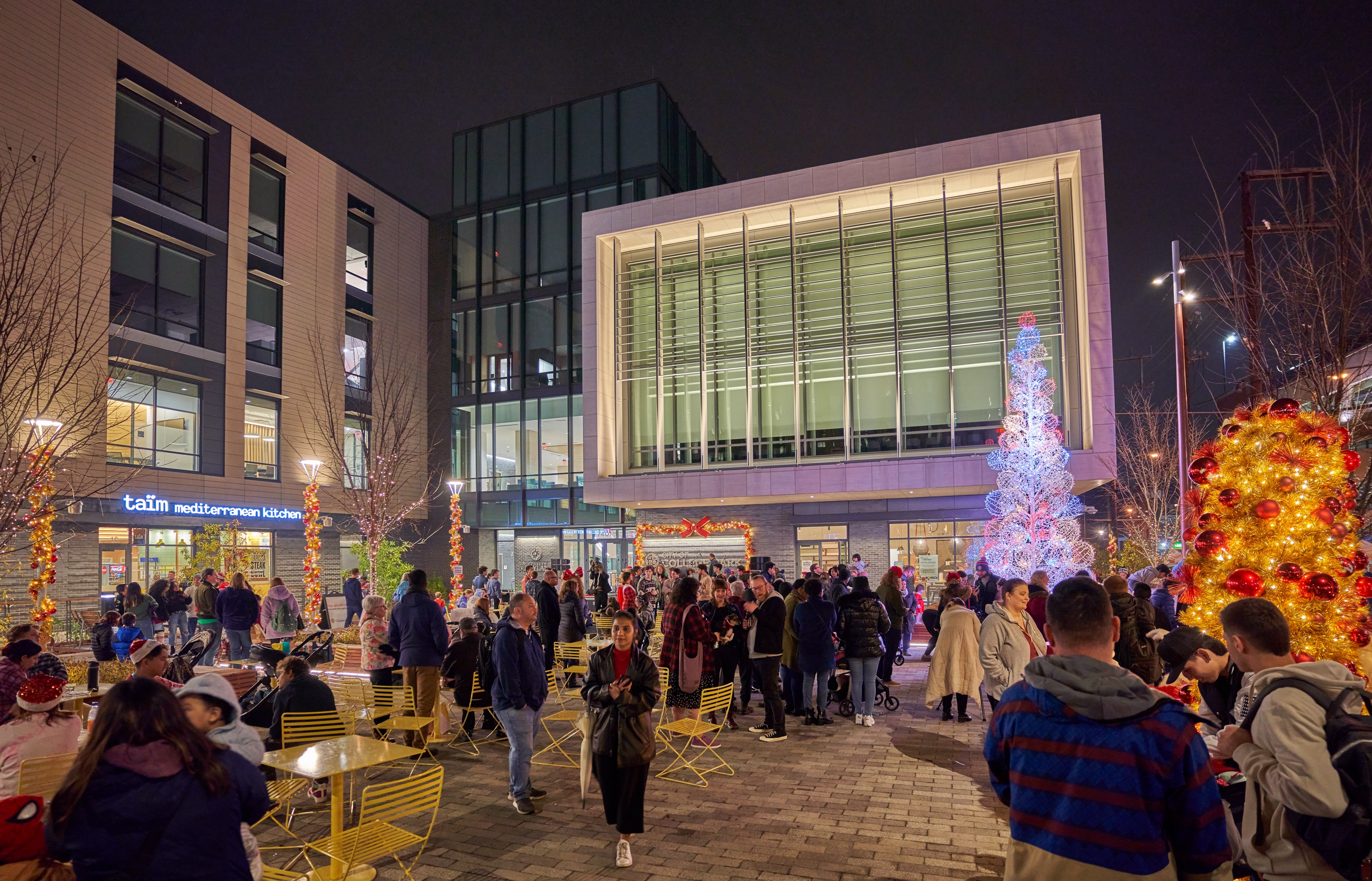
City hall plaza with tree lights at the College Park Winter Wonderland 2023

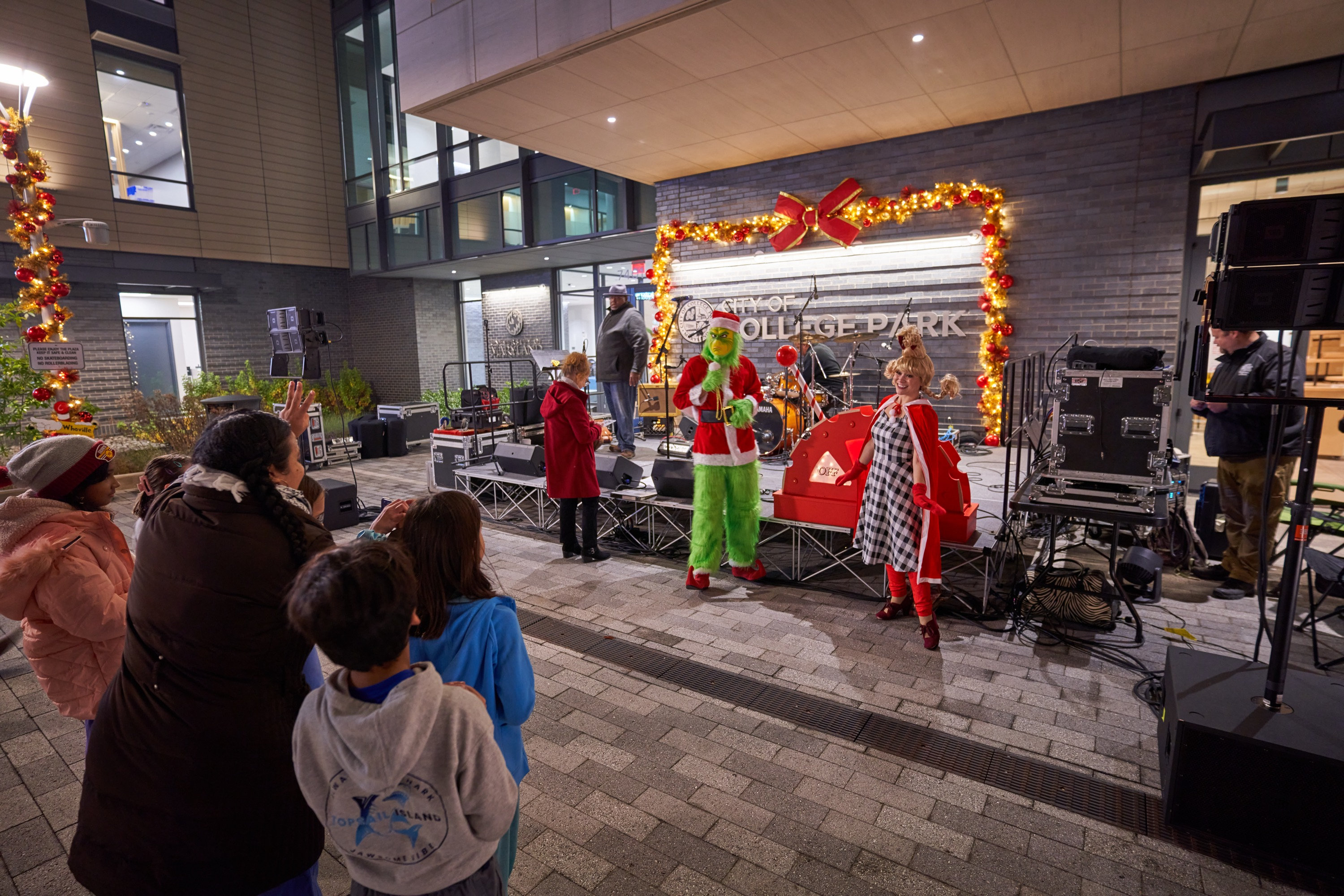
Grinch at the College Park Winter Wonderland 2023
