= The Rossborough Inn =

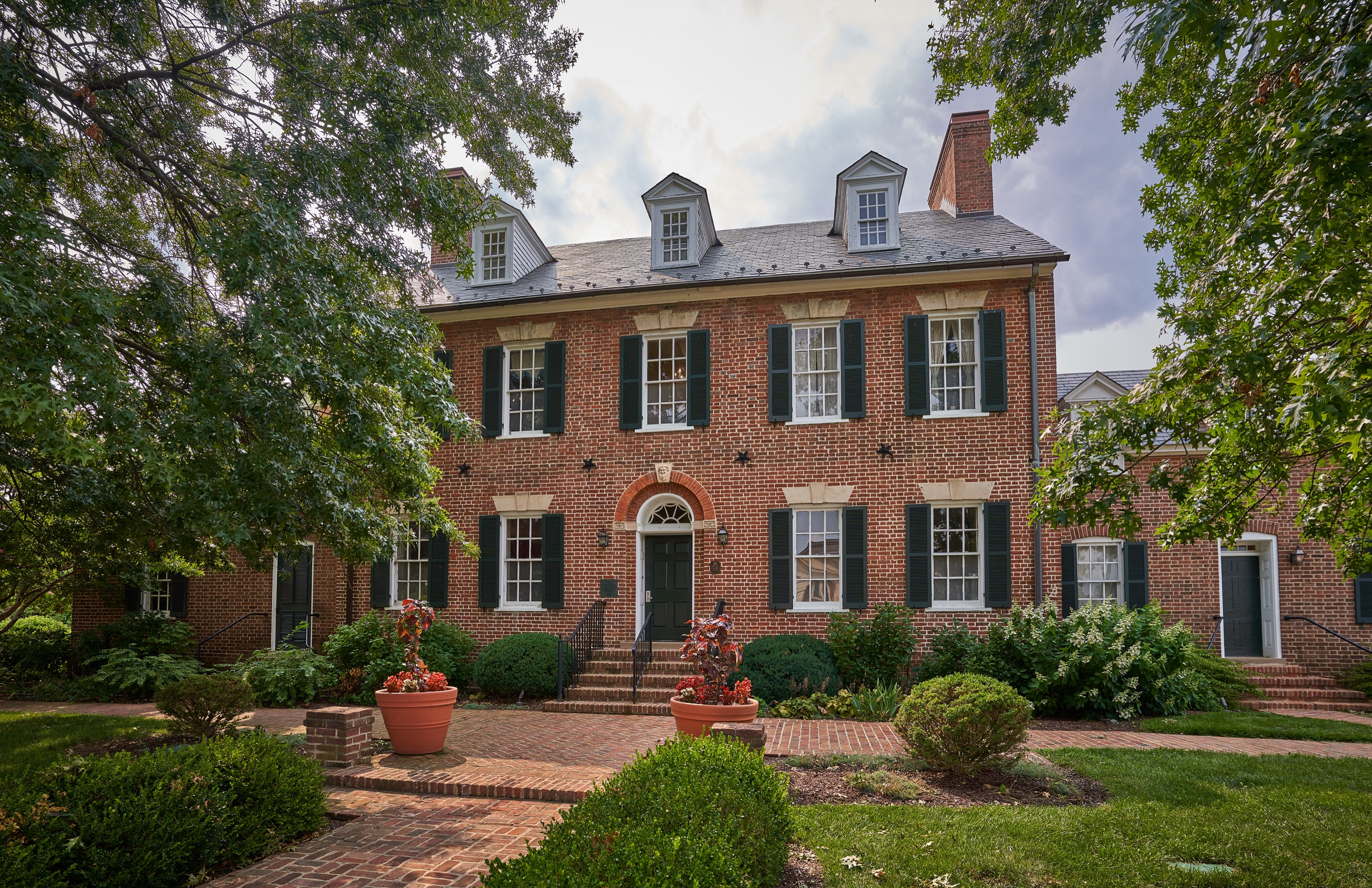
- Interactive map of the The Rossborough Inn area

General information
- Status: Oldest building on campus and College Park
- Type: Enrollment Management Offices
- Architectural style: Federal
- Location: South campus, on Baltimore Avenue; University of Maryland, College Park campus
- Coordinates: 38.9853°N 76.9376°W
- Named for: The Ross Family (proprietors)
- Groundbreaking: 1798
- Completed: 1803

Design and construction
- Architect: John Ross (?)

The Rossborough Inn is a historic building facing Baltimore Avenue/United States Route 1 (also formerly known as the old Washington Boulevard and the Washington and Baltimore Turnpike) on the eastern edge of the campus of the University of Maryland at College Park. Construction on the building began in 1798 and was completed in 1803, making it the oldest building on campus (older than the 1856 university itself) and the oldest building in the adjoining town of the City of College Park. It is built in the Federal style. The lower wings were added in 1938, as part of extensive renovations. The Rossborough Inn is listed as a historic site by the Maryland-National Capital Park and Planning Commission.

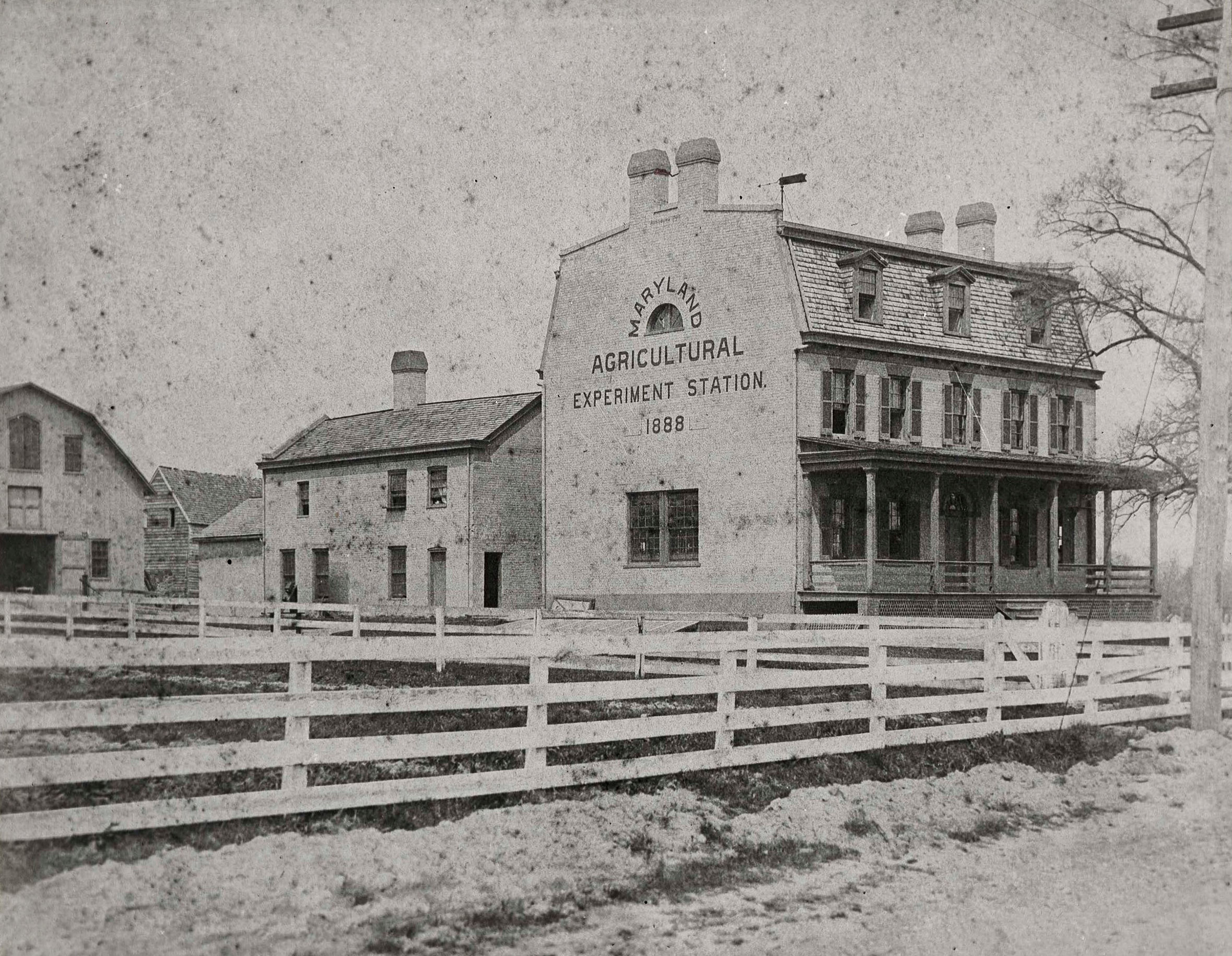
Rossborough Inn, part of the Maryland Agricultural College ca. 1901

The inn and tavern was constructed by land speculator John Ross, to serve people traveling between Baltimore and Washington D.C. (on the old Washington and Baltimore Turnpike). According to Anne Turkos, the former archivist for the University of Maryland Libraries, the name '"Rossborough"' refers to the name of the area the inn was built on in the late 18th Century and early 19th Century, after landowner Richard Ross ("Rossborough" was used interchangeably with "Rossburg" as late as the 1920s). By 1835, financial troubles had doomed the business and the building was being used as a farmhouse by its owner, Charles Benedict Calvert, (1808–1864), whose family owned the nearby Riversdale Plantation. In 1858, Calvert donated the land that the Rossborough building sat on to the Maryland Agricultural College (now University of Maryland at College Park).

The Rossborough Inn was a faculty residence when, in 1864, during the Civil War, Confederate Army General Bradley T. Johnson (of Frederick, Maryland) and his cavalry brigade occupied the university grounds, utilizing the building as his headquarters.

The building has been used for a variety of purposes since. Currently it contains the Office of Undergraduate Admissions, but it has acted as the home of University of Maryland Faculty and Alumni Club and housed a restaurant, "The Carriage House", that served lunch on weekdays.

According to campus lore, the Rossborough Inn is haunted by ghosts of the American Civil War.

Extensive renovations by the university (aided by the federal government) have resulted in a significantly more contemporary appearance than the original. Carved in the keystone above the front door is the head of Silenus, made of a rare Coade stone.
