= Calvert Hills Historic District =

Historic district in Maryland, United States

- U.S. National Register of Historic Places
- U.S. Historic district
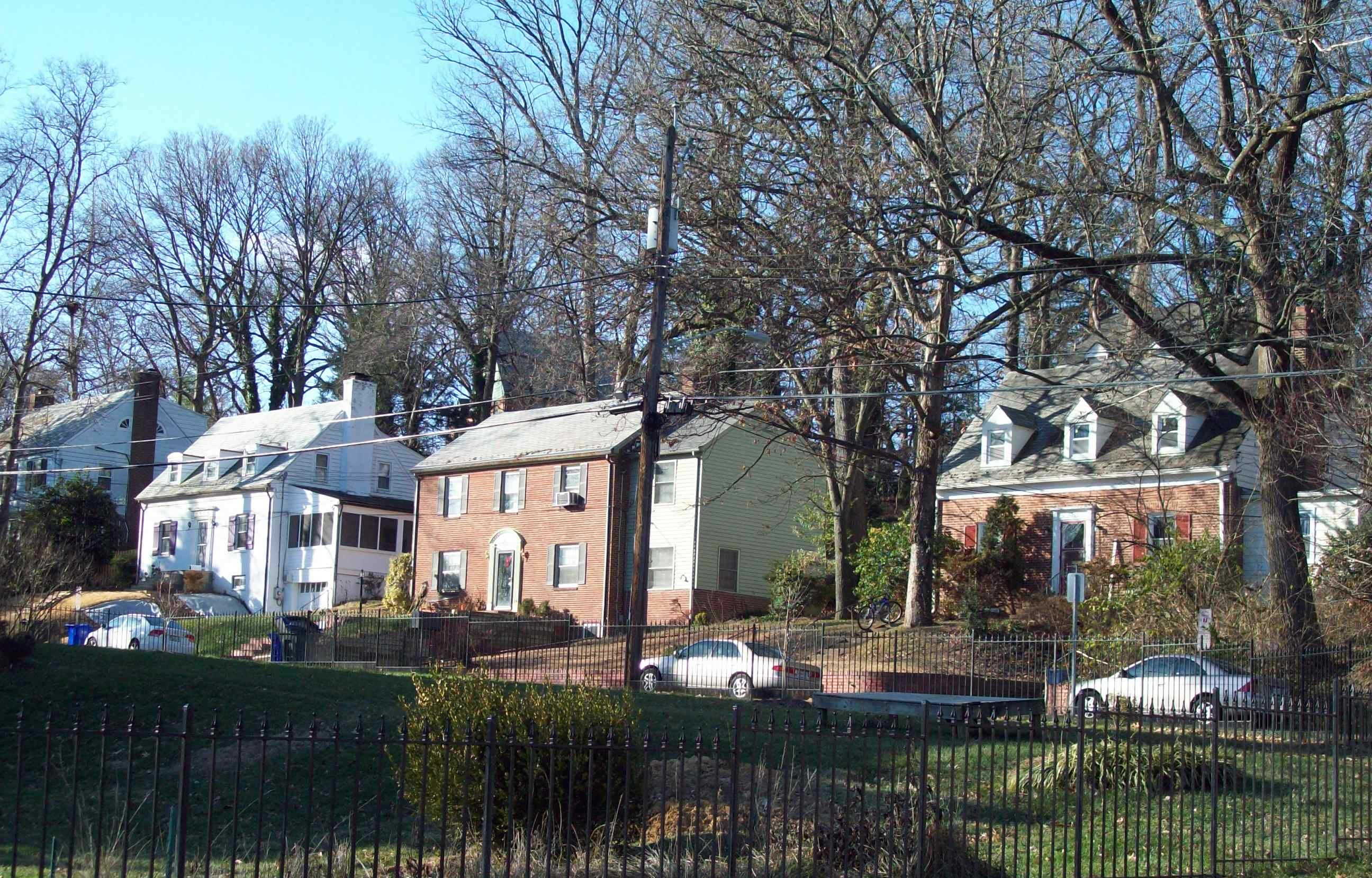
- Typical Street in the Calvert Hills Historic District, December 2008

- Location within Maryland Location within the United States
- Location: Roughly bounded by Calvert Rd., Bowdoin Ave., Erskine Rd., Calvert Park, Albion Rd., and Baltimore Rd., College Park, Maryland
- Coordinates: 38°58′28″N 76°56′5″W
- Area: 108 acres (44 ha)
- Built: 1907
- Architect: Ross, Webster R.,
- Architectural style: Queen Anne, Colonial Revival, et al.
- NRHP reference No.: 02001605
- Added to NRHP: December 23, 2002

Calvert Hills Historic District is a national historic district in College Park, Prince George's County, Maryland. It is roughly bounded on the north by Calvert Road, on the east by the Green Line metrorail corridor (the former Baltimore and Ohio Railroad right-of-way), on the south by the northern boundary of Riverdale Park, and on the west by Baltimore Avenue (US Route 1). It does not include Calvert Park on the southeast corner. Primarily a middle-class single-family residential neighborhood, it also includes some apartment houses as well as the College Park Post Office, a contributing property at 4815 Calvert Road.

== History ==
The district was developed in the early part of the 20th century by members of the Calvert family who were descendants or other relatives of Charles Benedict Calvert, the owner of Riversdale Plantation and Rossborough Farm and the founder of what is now the University of Maryland, College Park. The majority of homes were built for families in the early 1940s. Many of the single-family houses in the district follow a Colonial, Cape Cod, or Victorian style. Calvert Hills was annexed into the city of College Park in 1943.

It was added to the National Register of Historic Places in 2002.
