= Old Town College Park =

Historic house in Maryland, United States

- U.S. National Register of Historic Places
- U.S. Historic district
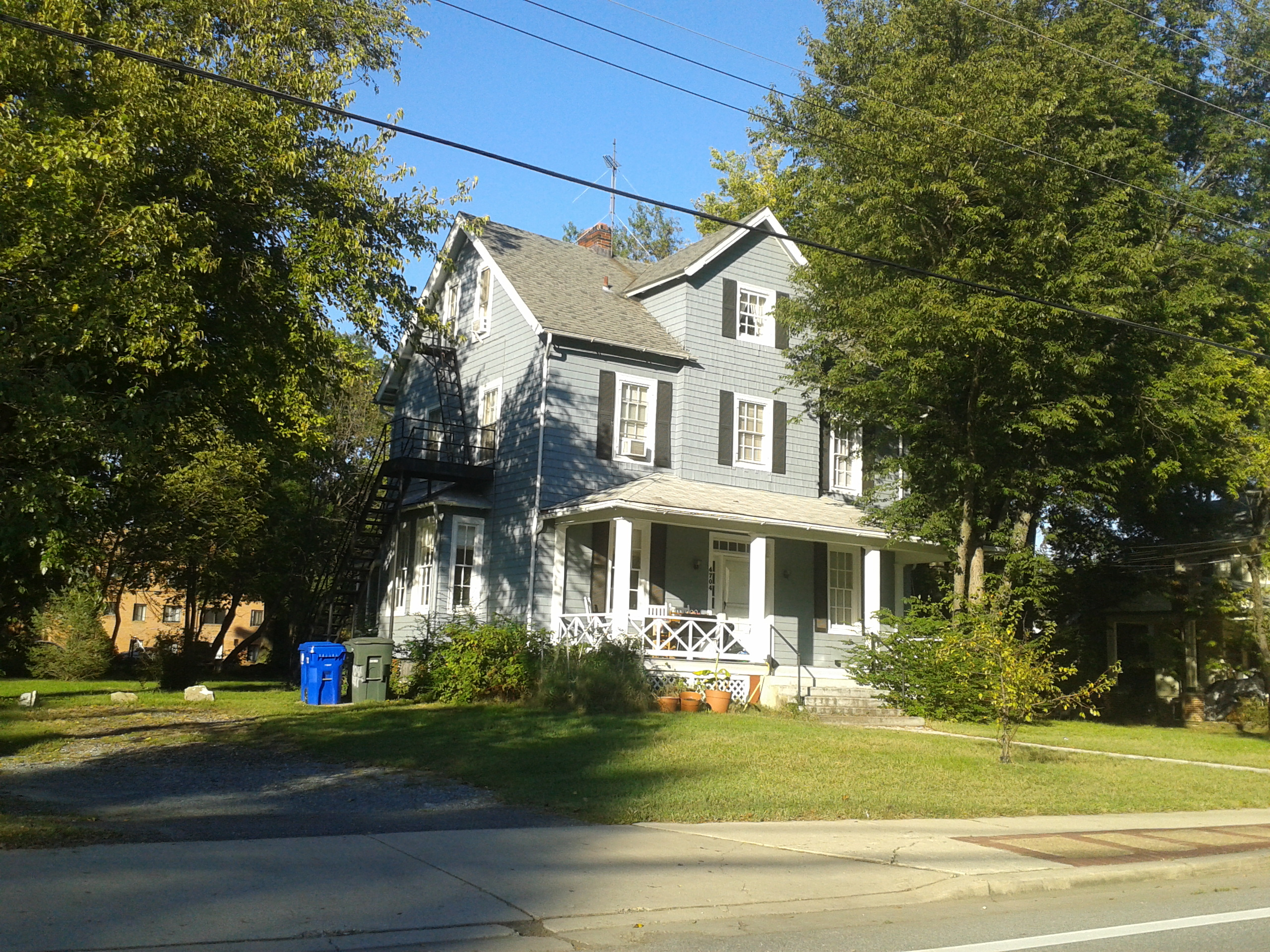

- Location within Maryland Location within the United States
- Location: Roughly bounded by Yale, & Columbia Aves., Calvert Rd., & UM Campus, College Park, Maryland
- Coordinates: 38°57′59″N 76°56′12″W
- Area: 120 acres (49 ha)
- Architect: Johnson and Curriden; Cutler, Henry Wright; Ross, R. Webster
- Architectural style: Federal, Queen Anne
- MPS: Historic Residential Suburbs in the United States, 1830-1960
- NRHP reference No.: 12000993
- Added to NRHP: December 4, 2012

Old Town is an historic neighborhood of College Park, Maryland. It is roughly bounded by the University of Maryland campus, the B&O Railroad tracks, and US Route 1. The area was plotted out in 1889, and built out over the next several decades, its developers seeking to attract commuters to Baltimore and Washington, DC, and individuals affiliated with the Maryland Agricultural College (as the school was then known). Most of the neighborhood is residential, with American Foursquare and Cape Cod style housing predominating. Closer to the university campus, the developers built garden-style apartment houses and other types of housing to cater to the academic community. The major non-residential structures are a Gothic Revival church, a modern post office and Washington Metro station.

The neighborhood was listed on the National Register of Historic Places in 2012.

Due to the close proximity of Old Town to campus, many fraternity and sorority chapters from University of Maryland own houses in this neighborhood.
