= Cory House (College Park, Maryland) =

Private residence in Maryland, US

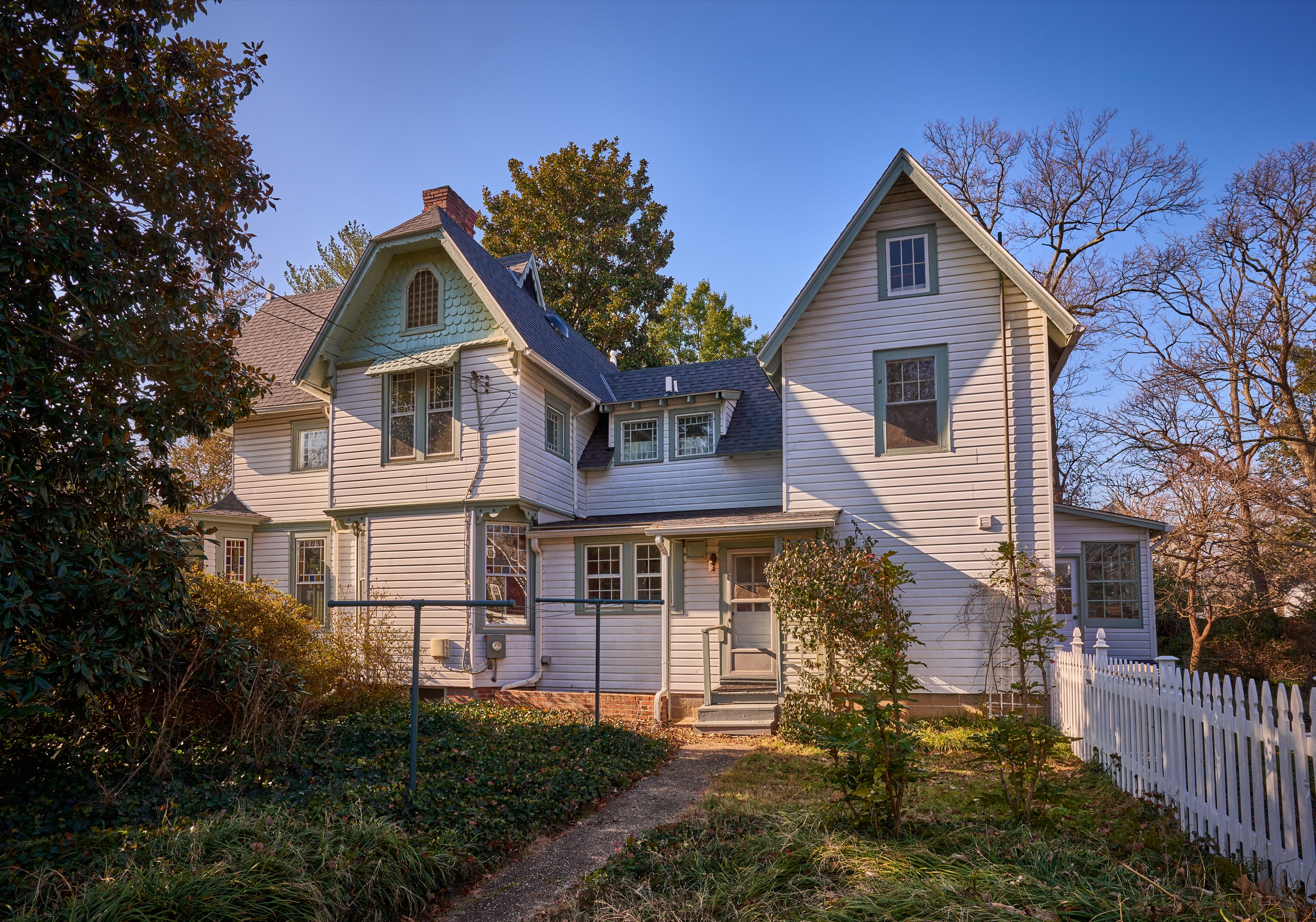

- Location within Maryland

General information
- Type: House/Private Residence
- Architectural style: American Queen Anne
- Location: 4710 College Avenue, College Park, MD, United States
- Coordinates: 38°58′50″N 76°55′49″W
- Completed: Circa 1891

Technical details
- Floor count: 2.5

The Cory House, constructed circa 1891, is one of the oldest private residences in College Park, Maryland. The house is an example of Queen Anne style architecture. The house is a registered Prince George's County Historic Site.

== History ==
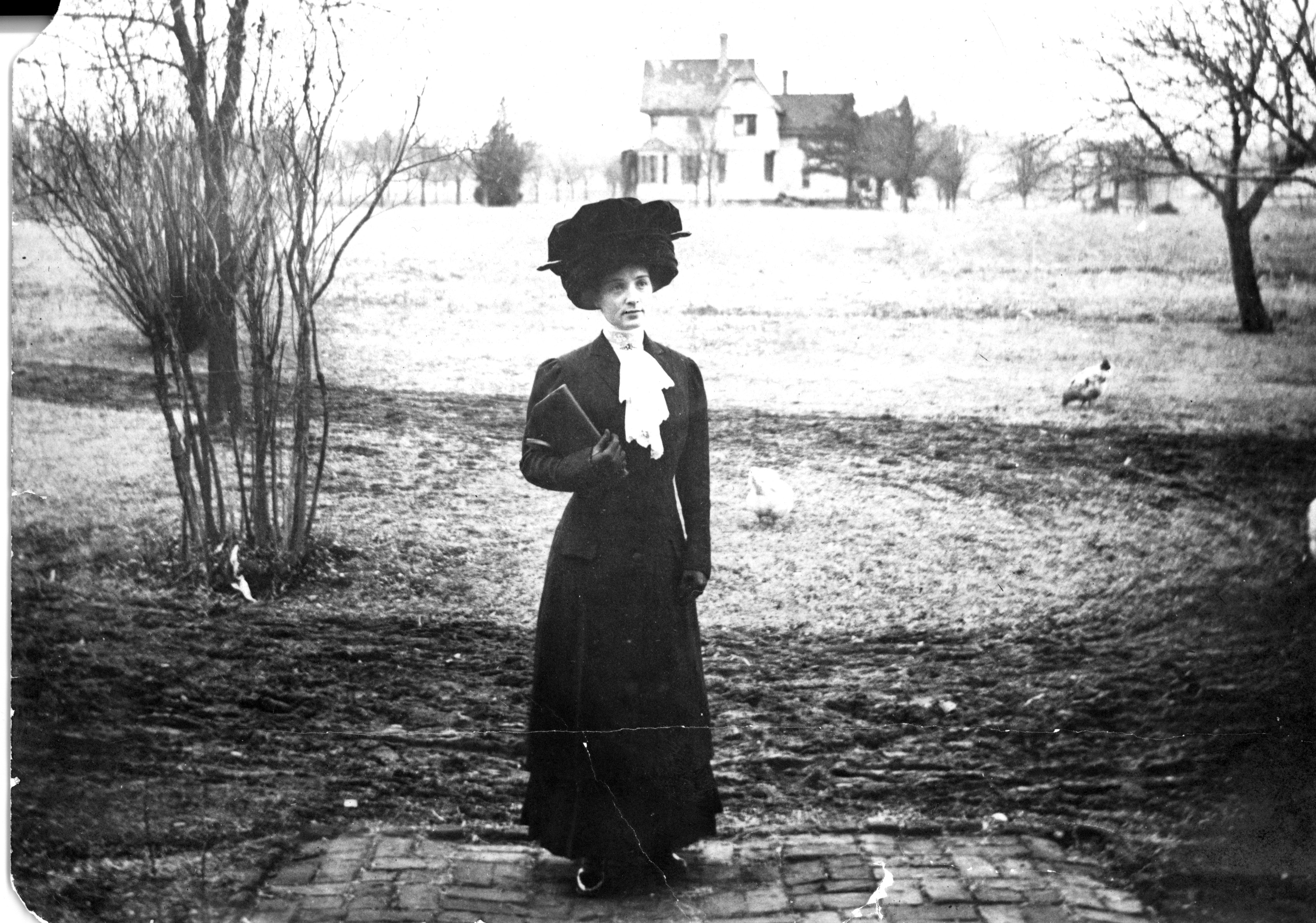
The Cory House with Mrs. Myron Creese, a neighbor of Prof. Cory, in the foreground

The Cory House was one of the first houses built in the 1889 Johnson and Curriden's subdivision of College Park. The house is named for its association with Professor Ernest Cory, who purchased the house in 1926 and resided there through 1975. Professor Cory graduated from the University of Maryland in 1909 and later served on the faculty, eventually chairing the Department of Entomology. Cory added the north wing in 1926 and planted the large private garden on the grounds.

== Architecture ==
The architecture of the Cory House is in part what provides its historical value. The House is built in an American Queen Anne style, with a cross-gabled frame. The house has 2½ stories and is laid out in a double "T" design. The house originally was of a single T design, with the main facade facing to the south and a main stem extending to the north; Professor Cory added the north wing in 1926.

== Preservation ==
The Cory House is a registered Prince George's County Historic Site and is not open to the public. However, the house is currently occupied as a private residence. The house's original wooden German siding has been covered with modern aluminum siding, placed to appear in a German style.
