= Benjamin Stoddert =

American politician (1751–1813)

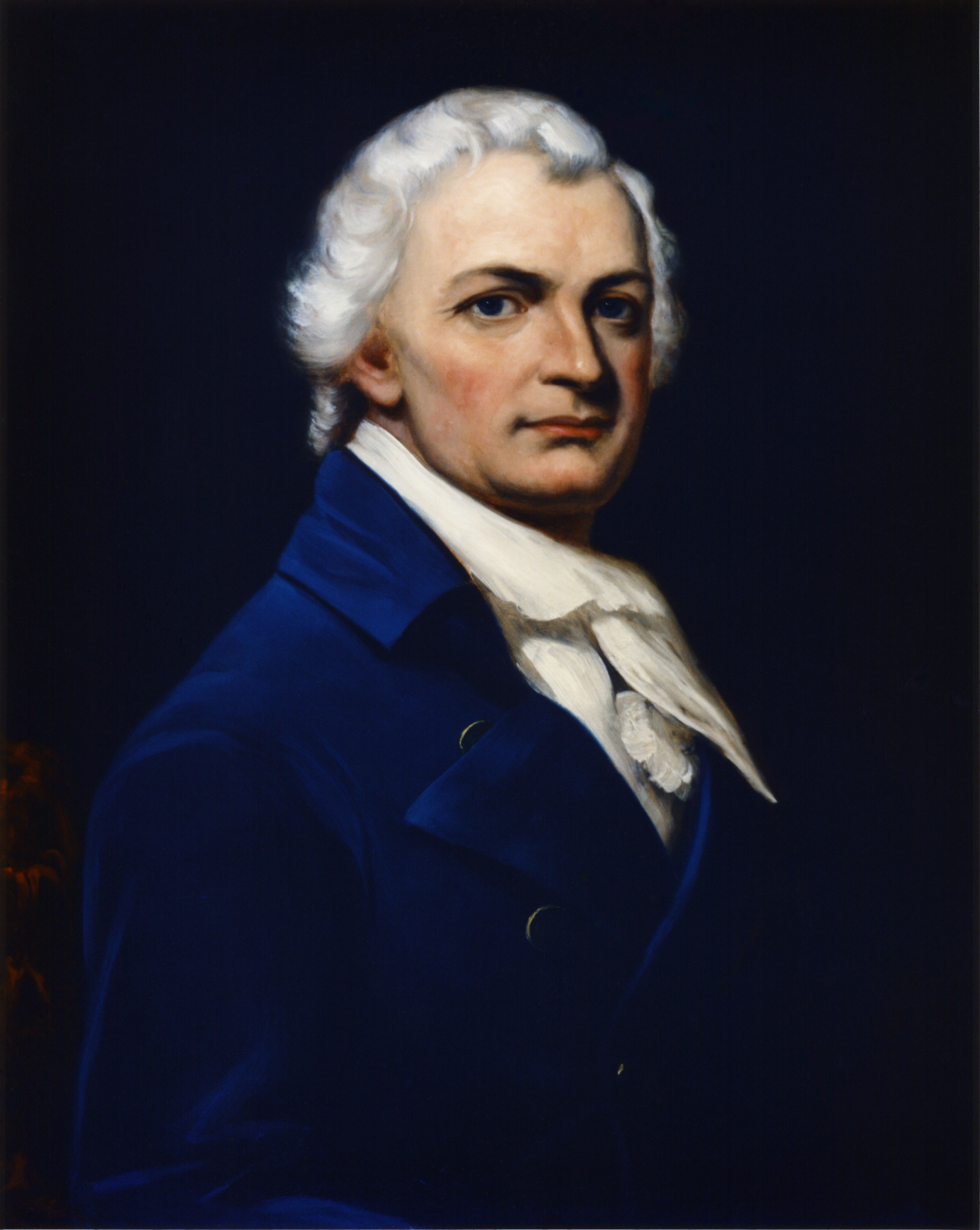

1st United States Secretary of the Navy
- In office June 18, 1798 – March 31, 1801
- President: John Adams; Thomas Jefferson
- Preceded by: Robert Morris (Agent of Marine)
- Succeeded by: Robert Smith

Personal details
- Born: 1751 Charles County, Maryland, British America
- Died: December 18, 1813 (aged 61–62) Bladensburg, Maryland, U.S.
- Party: Federalist
- Spouse: Rebecca Lowndes (m. 1781)
- Children: 8
- Education: University of Pennsylvania

Military service
- Rank: Captain
- Unit: Pennsylvania Cavalry
- Battles/wars: American Revolutionary War; Battle of Brandywine

Benjamin Stoddert (1751 – 18 December 1813) was the first United States Secretary of the Navy from 1 May 1798 to 31 March 1801.

== Early life and education ==
Stoddert was born in Charles County, Maryland in 1751, the son of Captain Thomas Stoddert. He was educated at the University of Pennsylvania and then worked as a merchant. He served as a captain in the Pennsylvania cavalry and later as secretary to the Continental Board of War during the American Revolutionary War. He was severely injured in the Battle of Brandywine and was subsequently released from active military service. In 1781, he married Rebecca Lowndes, daughter of Christopher Lowndes, a Maryland merchant, and they had eight children. They resided at the home of his father-in-law, Bostwick, located at Bladensburg, Maryland.

== Career ==
In 1783, Stoddert established a tobacco export business in Georgetown, with business partners Uriah Forrest and John Murdock.

After George Washington was elected President, he asked Stoddert to purchase key parcels of land in the area that would become the nation's capital before the formal decision to establish the federal city on the banks of the Potomac drove up prices there. Stoddert then transferred the parcels to the government. During the 1790s, he also helped found the Bank of Columbia to handle purchases of land in the District of Columbia for the federal government.

=== Secretary of the Navy ===
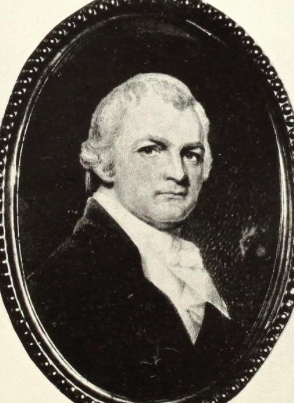
Benjamin Stoddert by Robert Field

In May 1798, President John Adams appointed Stoddert, a loyal Federalist, to oversee the newly established Department of the Navy. As the first Secretary of the Navy, Stoddert soon found himself dealing with an undeclared naval war with France, which would come to be known as the Quasi-War. Stoddert realized that the infant U.S. Navy possessed too few warships to protect a far-flung merchant marine by using convoys or patrolling the North American coast. Instead, he concluded that the best way to defeat the French campaign against American shipping was by offensive operations in the Caribbean, where most of the French cruisers were based. Thus at the very outset of the conflict, the Department of the Navy adopted a policy of going to the source of the enemy's strength. American successes during the conflict resulted from a combination of Stoddert's administrative skill in deploying his limited forces and the initiative of his seagoing officers. Under Stoddert's leadership, the reestablished United States Navy acquitted itself well and achieved its goal of stopping the depredations of French ships against American commerce.

Stoddert concerned himself with the Navy's daily administration and operations and the service's future strength. He established the first six navy yards and advocated building twelve 74 gun ships of the line. Congress initially approved construction of these ships in 1799. A design was prepared by Joshua Humphrey, who had prepared the initial designs for the 44 gun frigates of 1797 and lumber collected at the new Navy Yard.

Following the peace accord with France, the U.S. Navy's personnel strength and the number of active vessels were reduced. The Jefferson Administration reduced active naval strength to three frigates (twelve were built between 1797 and 1800) and sold off or used the collected supplies in the Navy Yards for gunboat construction.

Stoddert established the Navy Department Library due to instructions received from President Adams in a letter dated 31 March 1800.

== Post-Navy life ==
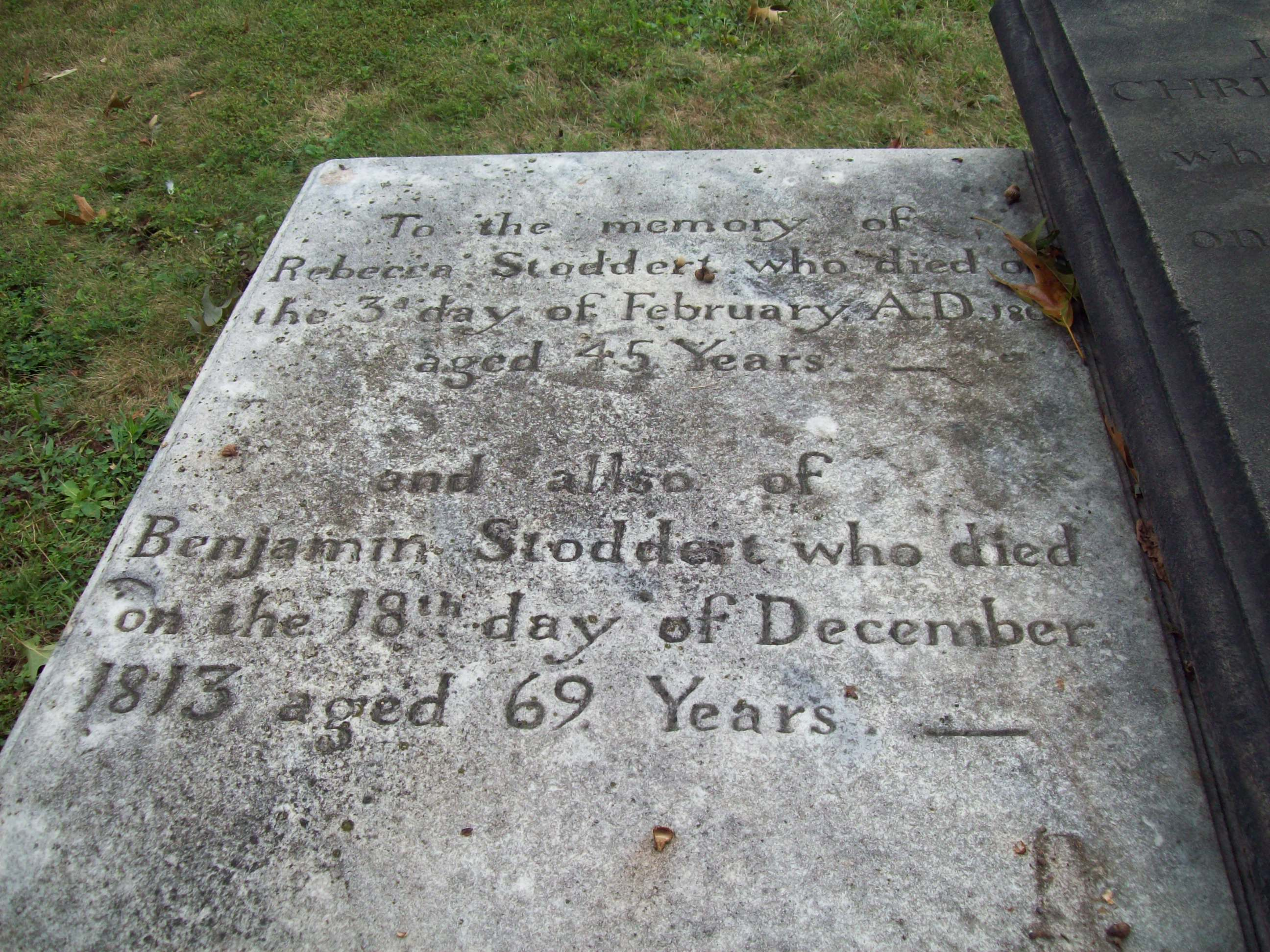
Grave of Benjamin Stoddert, September 2009

He left office in March 1801 to return to commercial life. Following his term as Secretary of the Navy, Stoddert's final years witnessed a decline in his fortunes: as Stoddert lost heavily in land speculation, Georgetown declined as a commercial center, and the Embargo and the War of 1812 brought American overseas trade to a halt. During this period, he lived at Halcyon House, on the corner at 3400 Prospect Street NW.

Stoddert died on the 18th of December 1813 and is buried in the graveyard at Addison Chapel, Seat Pleasant, Maryland.

== Things named for Benjamin Stoddert ==
- Two Navy ships: USS Stoddert (DD-302), 1920–1935, and USS Benjamin Stoddert (DDG-22), 1964–1991
- Fort Stoddert in the Mississippi Territory (today Alabama)
- Benjamin Stoddert Middle School in Waldorf, Maryland
- Benjamin Stoddert Middle School in Temple Hills, Maryland
- Benjamin Stoddert Elementary School in Washington D.C.

In the Georgetown section of Washington, DC, there was a Stoddert Street named after Benjamin Stoddert. In the Georgetown street renaming of 1895 the name was changed to Q Street NW. An apartment building that today stands at 2900 Q Street NW is named The Stoddert.

In Landover, Maryland there is a residential street named after him.

== Notes and references ==
Political offices
New office	United States Secretary of the Navy; 1798–1801	Succeeded by Robert Smith
