= Market Master's House (Bladensburg, Maryland) =

Historic house in Maryland, United States

- U.S. National Register of Historic Places
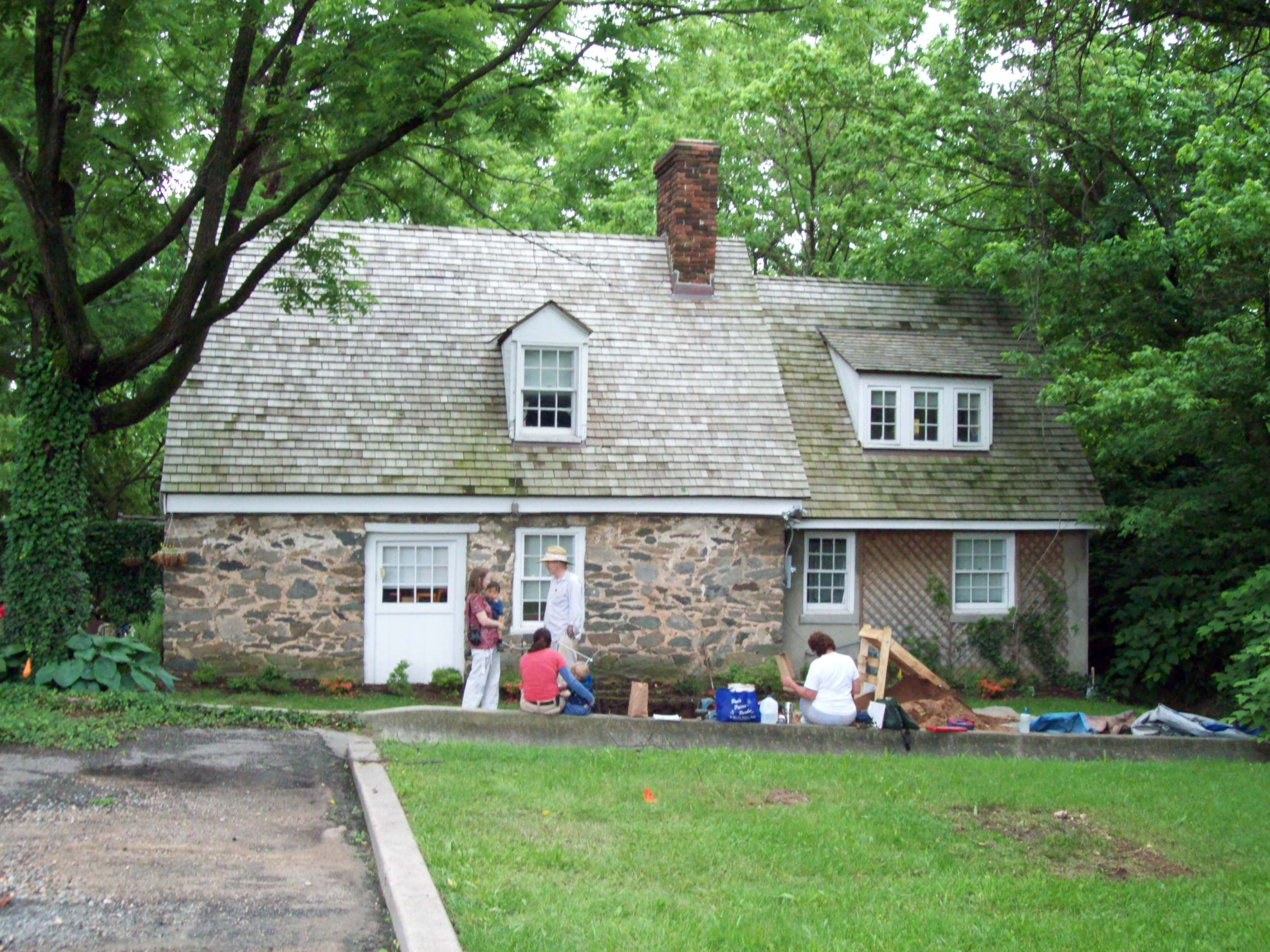
- Market Master's House, June 2009

- Location within District of Columbia
- Location: 4006 48th St., Bladensburg, Maryland
- Coordinates: 38°56′21″N 76°56′13″W
- Area: less than one acre
- Built: c. 1765
- Architectural style: Colonial
- NRHP reference No.: 90000553
- Added to NRHP: March 29, 1990

The Market Master's House is an 18th-century vernacular Colonial-era stone dwelling with 20th-century additions, set at the rear of a long, narrow lot in Bladensburg, Prince George's County, Maryland. It was constructed c. 1765, when Bladensburg was an active tobacco shipping port.

The Market Master's House is significant for its association with the 18th century development of the town of Bladensburg. Lot 38 of Bladensburg was purchased by Christopher Lowndes, who built nearby Bostwick, on September 23, 1760. The use of the Market Master's House as a headquarters for tobacco inspectors or an overseer of tobacco marketing activity has not been proven, and no description of an approved Market Master has been found for the town of Bladensburg. However, the Market Master's House is one of only four buildings remaining from this significant period of the town's history.

The original block is a two-by-one bay, gable-roofed, 25 × 20 foot structure, 1 1/2 stories, of randomly laid roughly shaped non-native stone. The stone is thought to have been brought to the site originally as ship ballast, therefore it is also known as the Ship's Ballast House. It contains one room on the first story, a corner stair, and one room on the second story. A small two-story west kitchen addition and one-story south shed-roofed addition were added about 1920, with later additions and renovations completed in 1956. In May - June 2009, the Maryland State Highway Administration and the Center for Heritage Resource Studies (CHRS) at the University of Maryland, College Park sponsored archeological digs at the site.

It was listed on the National Register of Historic Places in 1990.
