= Kimche =

Kimche is a Jewish surname.

== People named Kimche ==
- David Kimche (1928–2010), Israeli diplomat, deputy director of the Mossad, spymaster and journalist
- Jon Kimche (1909–1994), British journalist and historian
