= Olivia Frank =

Transgender Israeli intelligence agent (1956–2023)

- אוליביה ג'יין פרנק
- Olivia Frank wearing an Israeli Military Uniform
- Born: March 17, 1956
- Died: September 11, 2023 (aged 67)

Olivia Jayne Frank (Hebrew: אוליביה ג'יין פרנק; 17 March 1956 – 11 September 2023) was a transgender woman who served as an Israel Defense Forces (IDF) officer and became an intelligence agent for the Mossad, MI5 and MI6. In her memoirs, she wrote about being recruited by David Kimche, infiltrating the Abu Nidal Organization, and thwarting a bombing conspiracy in Munich before being returned to England by the Mossad. She also recounted assisting MI5/MI6 in an operation against Asil Nadir.

== Early life and identity ==
Born to Jewish parents, Frank was assigned male at birth. She grew up in Gorton, Manchester, England, and travelled to Israel as a teenager in 1974 to join the Israel Defense Forces using a forged passport.

She recalls being "a mixed-up teenager who wanted to be both a woman and a soldier" in her youth, and states that she was described as having a "female brain" by the doctors who prescribed her estrogen. She later had gender-affirming surgery.

== Military and intelligence work for Israel ==
Frank became an IDF officer, taking part in night raids and receiving counterterrorism and intelligence training. Her first partner was an Israeli officer who was killed shielding her during combat in Lebanon.

According to her, she was thereafter recruited to join the Mossad by David Kimche. In 1985, she was sent to Munich to infiltrate the Abu Nidal Organization, which had connections to a German right-wing extremist group, Wehrsportgruppe Hoffman. The Wehrsportgruppe Hoffman had around 400 members and possessed illegal weapons and Nazi paraphernalia. One of the people associated with the organisation committed the Oktoberfest bombing.

She claims that a few weeks after she infiltrated Abu Nidal, a man named 'Konrad' attached bombs to her body and sent her to a building where Jewish families lived. She managed to set off a distress call and was extracted by Israeli intelligence. 'Konrad', whose real name is Karl-Heinz Hoffmann, was arrested by German police along with other Wehrsportgruppe Hoffman members. He was later sentenced to a 9.5 year prison sentence for other crimes, three of which he served.

== Alleged work for British intelligence and later life ==
=== Work for British intelligence ===
Frank stated that she was prosecuted on made-up charges due to a rift between British and Israeli Intelligence upon her return to England. She alleged that she was subsequently recruited into MI5 and MI6, and directed to spy on a fellow inmate and entice a fugitive to return into British jurisdiction. She stated that the money for her gender reassignment surgeries came from British intelligence.

The British Ministry of Justice refused to comment.

=== Book publication ===
In 2019, she published The Mossad Spy, a memoir about her life. She claimed that someone connected to British intelligence attempted to pay her £50,000 to not publish the book.

In the aftermath, Tablet reported that she had identified Karl-Heinz Hoffmann as the man she had known as Konrad after seeing his face in a 2019 Tablet article. Frank had not seen Hoffman since 1985, when he placed two remote-controlled bombs on her body and sent her into a home of Jews from Munich. She was reportedly saved when David Kimche's Mossad team disarmed the explosives.

== Death and burial ==
After her death, her Jewish identity was verified by Israeli intelligence in order to facilitate a Jewish burial. Her burial was complicated because Frank was a "meis mitzvah," that is, a Jew with no living relatives whose burial had to be financed through charity. However, her identity and past work could be confirmed through an anonymous source in the Israeli intelligence community.

As Orthodox Jewish religious law does not recognise transition, the masculine version of the burial prayer was used. (Note: It is specifically Orthodox Jewish law that does not recognise gender transition. On the Reform Jewish law view, for example, see: Irshai, R. (2019). "The construction of gender in halakhic Responsa by the Reform movement: transgender people as a case study". Journal of Modern Jewish Studies. 18 (2): 160–176. doi:10.1080/14725886.2019.1595496.) However, the ritual washing of the body was done by women, in the hope of following the deceased's wishes.

== See also ==
- Tracey Ballard
- Efrat Tilma
