= Israel Council on Foreign Relations =

Public policy think tank

- Abbreviation: ICFR
- Formation: 1989
- Founder: David Kimche
- Type: Public policy think tank
- Location: Jerusalem
- President: Dan Meridor
- Website: israelcfr.com

The Israel Council on Foreign Relations (ICFR) is an independent, non-partisan forum for the study and debate of foreign policy issues, especially those relating to the State of Israel and the Jewish people. The ICFR publishes a triannual policy and scholarly journal, The Israel Journal of Foreign Affairs, which offers a platform for the discussion and analysis of international affairs. From its inception, the ICFR operated under the auspices of the World Jewish Congress. In the summer of 2025, the WJC decided to spin off the Council, which compelled it to seek new funding.

== Overview ==
ICFR was founded in 1989 by David Kimche (1928–2010), a former deputy-director of the Mossad, the Israeli intelligence agency, who later served as director-general of Israel's Ministry of Foreign Affairs and Israeli ambassador-at-large. The Israel Council on Foreign Relations is dedicated to the examination of international affairs, with special emphasis on world Jewish concerns and Israeli foreign policy. Based on the models of the New York Council on Foreign Relations and the British Chatham House, the Council is not affiliated with any governmental or academic institutions. It is an autonomous body maintaining a non-partisan approach to foreign policy matters, and accommodating a broad range of viewpoints. Participants in the Council come from a wide cross-section of the most influential spheres of Israeli society, including government and Knesset officials, university professors, and leading businessmen, bankers, lawyers, and journalists. The Council hosts speakers from around the world, including heads of state, prime ministers, foreign ministers, and other distinguished visitors. As well, the council hosts conferences, seminars, and a bi-monthly Young Diplomats' Forum, which brings together Israeli diplomats and their counterparts posted in Israel.

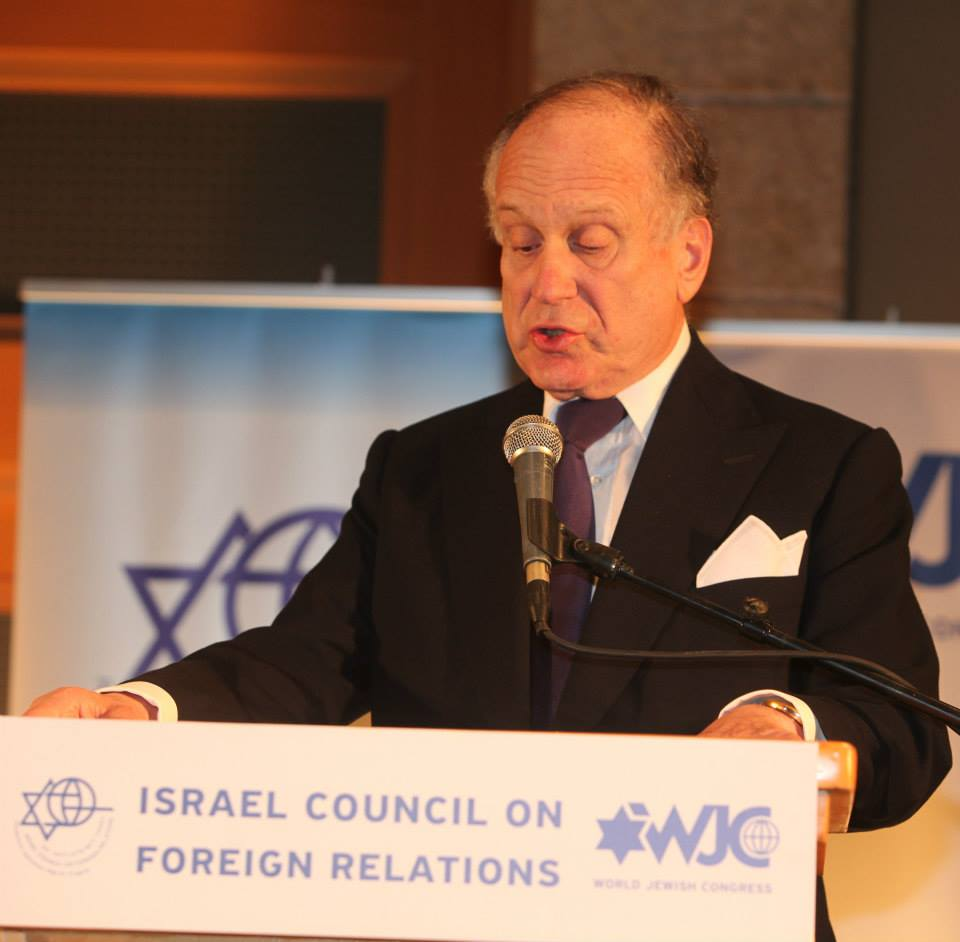
WJC President Ronald S. Lauder speaking at ICFR event "The Middle East Vortex: Views from Washington, Moscow and Berlin"

== Mission ==
According to the ICFR's website, "The Council is an independent, multidisciplinary institution, established on the model of the New York Council on Foreign Relations and the British Chatham House. The Council aspires to stimulate public awareness of world events and insightful discussion of foreign policy issues, particularly regarding Israel and the Middle East. As such, it accommodates a broad range of viewpoints."

== Activities ==
The Israel Council on Foreign Relations publishes a tri-annual journal called the Israel Journal of Foreign Affairs, which has been called "one of the best publications in the field." It focuses specifically on issues of international relations most pertinent to Israel and the Jewish people, and attracts the writing of leading authorities and statesmen from Israel and abroad.

In the last years of his life, Professor Yehuda Bauer, wrote some numerous articles for the journal on subjects as diverse as the Arab-Israeli conflict, Holocaust obfuscation, antisemitism, migration, genocide prevention, illiberalism and threats to Israel democracy. Among others who regularly write for the journal are its senior editor, Prof. Chuck Freilich, former Newsweek bureau chief Andrew Nagorski, Hebrew University law professor Robbie Sabel, Dr. Juliana Geran Pilon of the Alexander Hamilton Institute, Stanford University professor Amichai Magen, and Bulgarian Middle East expert and diplomat Dr. Dimitar Mihaylov.

In an article in November 2025, the Czech Foreign Minister, Jan Lipavský expressed Prague’s support for Israel but called on Jerusalem to support Ukraine, which would "enhance its own security, strategic autonomy, and moral standing.”

In addition, the ICFR provides a forum for visiting dignitaries, diplomats, scholars, journalists and business leaders who seek a non-governmental platform in which to present and discuss their views. In recent years, guest lecturers have included the Secretary-General of the UN, presidents, prime Ministers, foreign ministers, ambassadors, and mayors. The transcripts of these lectures are often published in the Israel Journal of Foreign Affairs. In one of these lectures, Likud party leader Benjamin Netanyahu announced on the eve of Likud's election victory in April 1996, his intention to pursue the negotiation process set forth in the Oslo agreements and respect facts on the ground.

The council also holds regular conferences and seminars on various foreign policy issues, including an annual symposium on the Middle East in memory of ICFR founder, David Kimche. The transcripts of such lectures are often published in the Israel Journal of Foreign Affairs.

In 2011 the ICFR launched the European-Israeli Young Diplomats' Forum, a series of monthly policy talks which enable Israeli and European diplomats posted in Israel to exchange ideas on issues of common interest through policy talks, which was later widen to include diplomats from other parts of the world.

The ICFR also cooperates with other councils on foreign relations and relevant NGOs, including the Konrad Adenauer Stiftung, Hebrew University, European Forum, Polish Institute of International Affairs (PISM), the Australian Institute of International Affairs (AIIA), and the Institute of International Politics and Economics in Serbia.

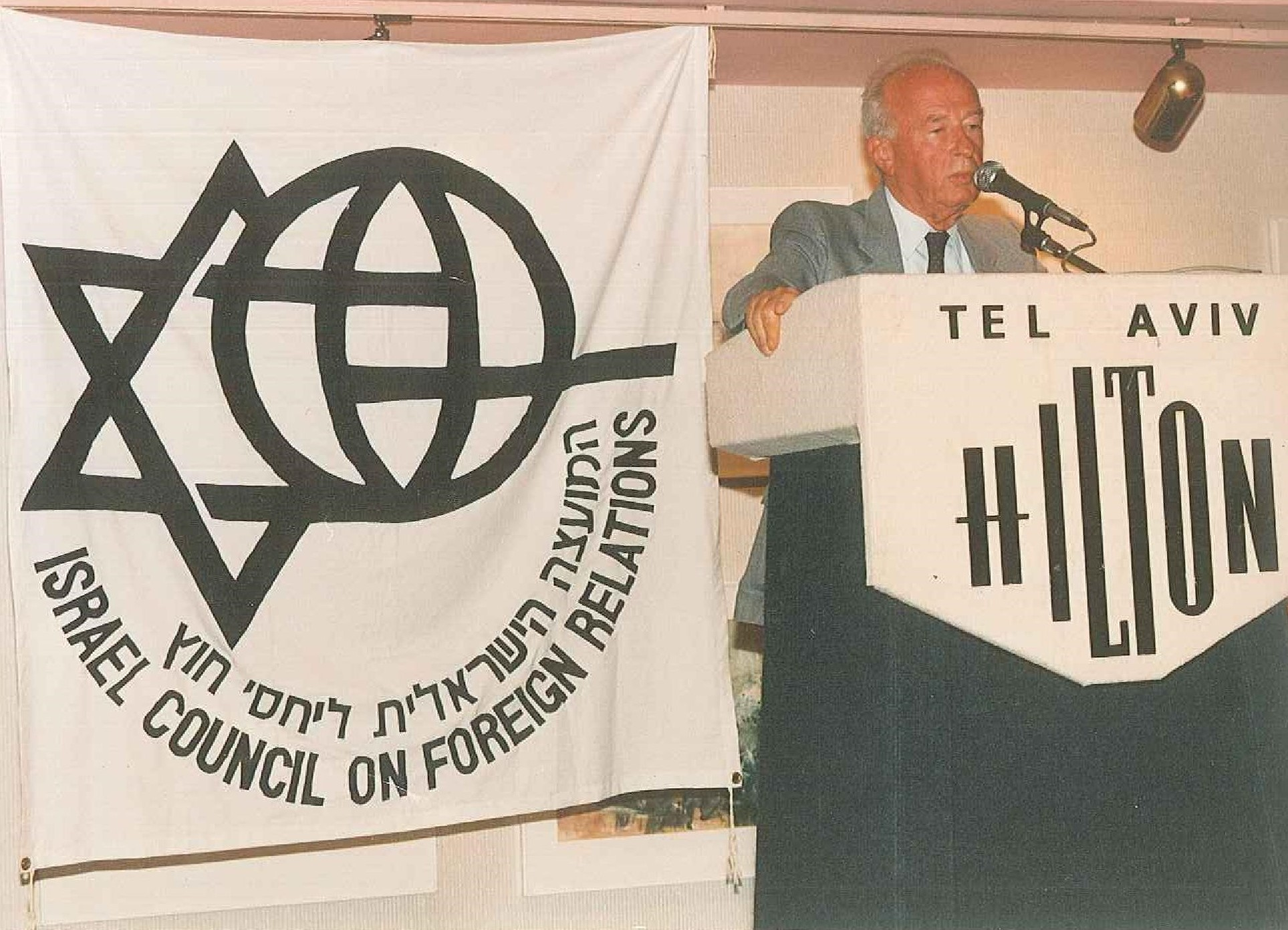
The Late Israeli Prime Minister Yitzhak Rabin speaking at ICFR event

== Board of directors ==
- Founder: David Kimche (1928–2010)
- President: Dan Meridor
- President emeritus: Avi Primor
- Director: Laurence Weinbaum
- Associate Director: Yvette Shumacher
