= Bostwick (Bladensburg, Maryland) =

Historic house in Maryland, US

- U.S. National Register of Historic Places
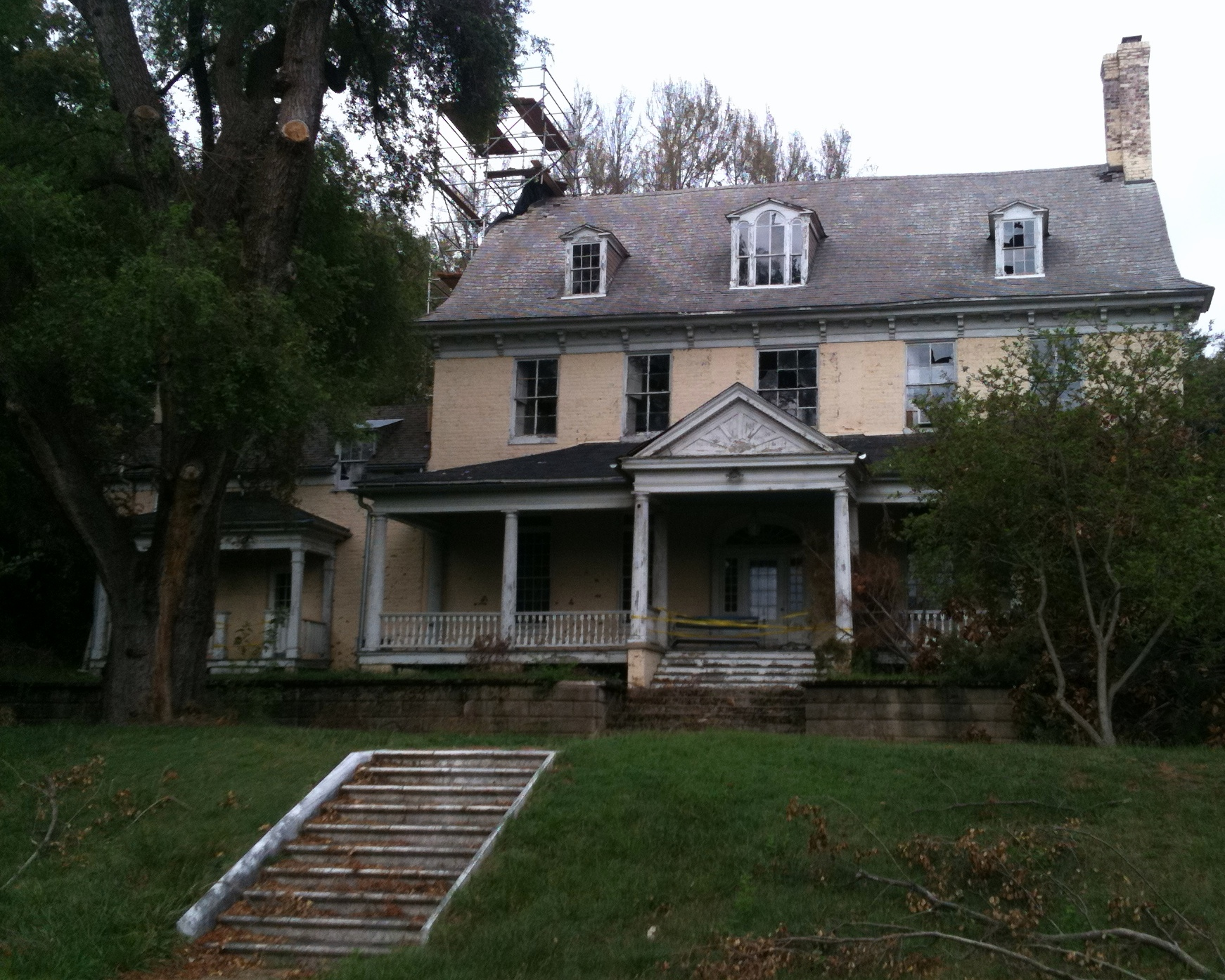
- Bostwick, July 2012

- Location within Maryland
- Location: 3901 48th Street, Bladensburg, Maryland
- Coordinates: 38°56′16″N 76°56′5″W
- Area: 9 acres (3.6 ha)
- Architect: Christopher Lowndes
- Architectural style: Adamesque
- NRHP reference No.: 75002082
- Added to NRHP: August 19, 1975

Bostwick is a historic home located a short distance below Lowndes Hill, the present-day property of Bladensburg Elementary School in Bladensburg, Prince George's County, Maryland, United States. According to its date plaque, it was built in 1746 by Christopher Lowndes (1713-1785). The house was later the home of Lowndes’ son-in-law, Benjamin Stoddert (1751-1813), first Secretary of the Navy. Colonel Thomas H. Barclay (Tory in the American Revolution; brother-in-law of Lt. Colonel Beverly Robinson; first British consul appointed in New York after the peace of 1783; British agent for prisoners of war in War of 1812) resided at "Bostwick," the oldest surviving structure at Bladensburg. Located nearby is the Market Master's House, also built by Lowndes.

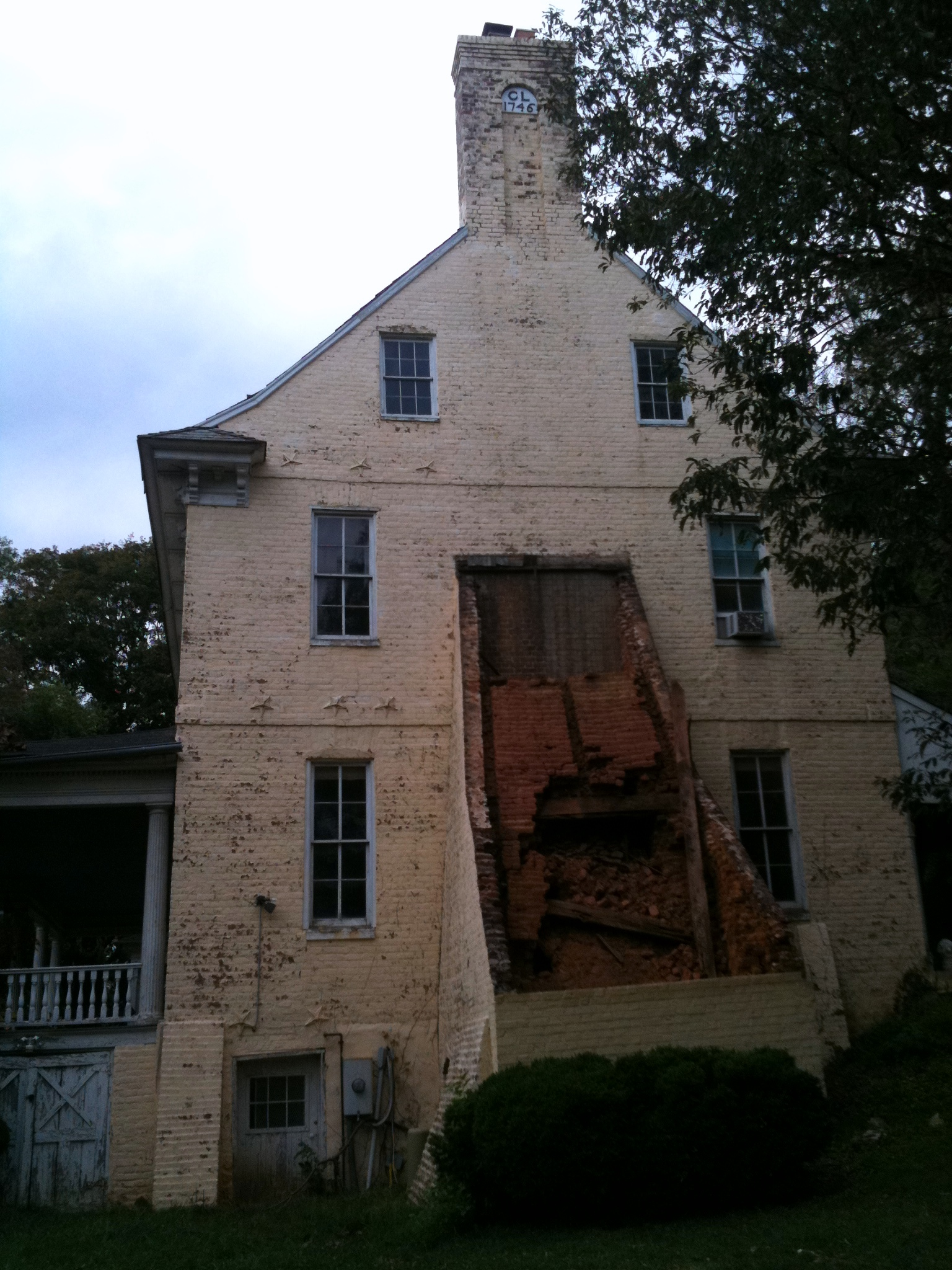
The south end of the home

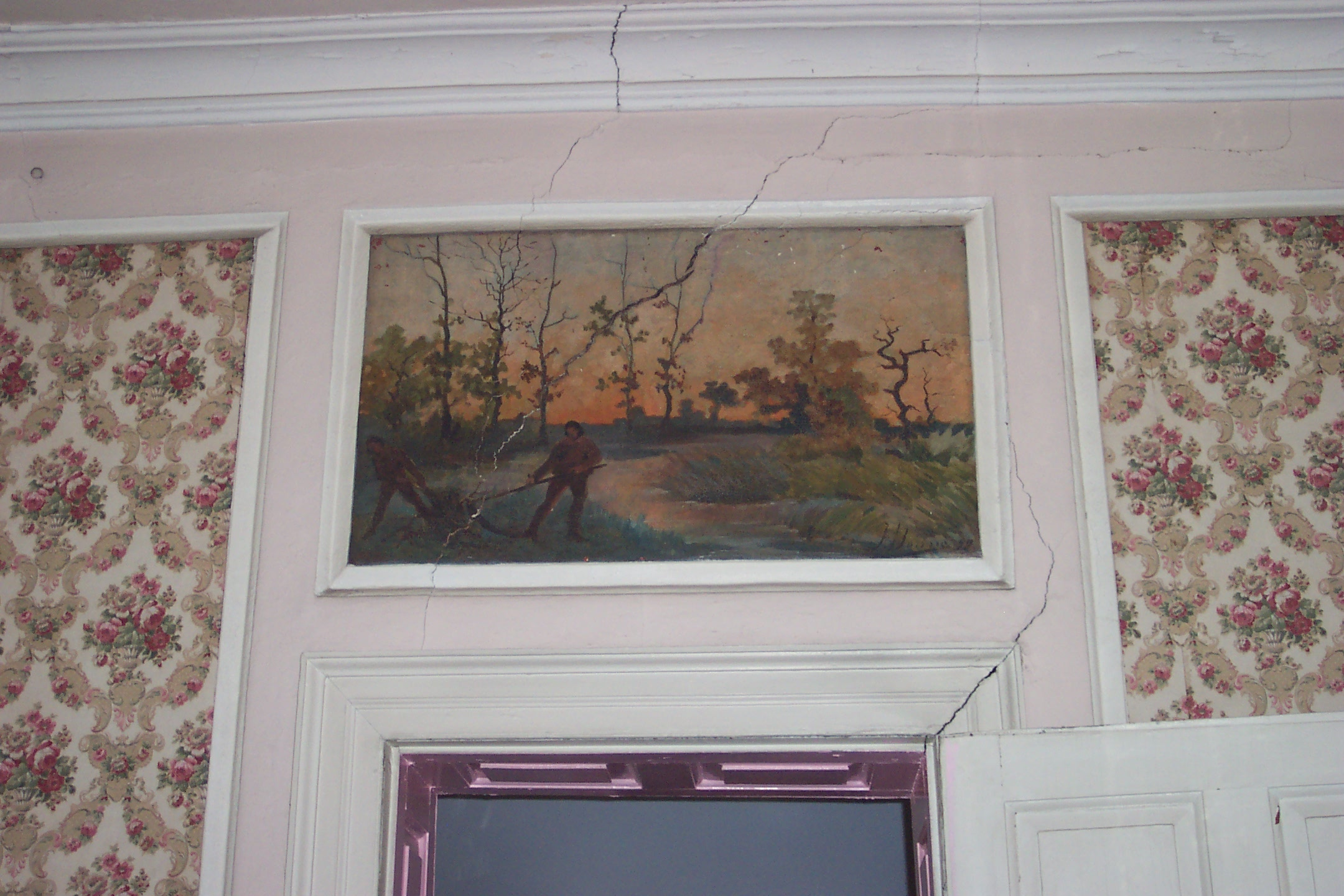
Overmantel painting inside the house. Note cracks and other damage to the wall.

Bostwick is a 2 1/2-story brick structure laid up in Flemish bond. A basement and ground level lies under the entire house. The gable roof, with dormer windows, is slightly belled at the eaves. The main (west) facade is five bays with a central doorway. A one-story porch extends across the front, and the pedimented central bay of the porch projects forward. "C.L. 1746" in wrought lead painted black is embedded high in the south chimney. Also on the south side is a distinctive buttress added about 1800 by Stoddert, who was concerned about a crack in the wall on that side of the house. At the base of the buttress are two dungeons or cells. A gable-roofed common bond brick detached kitchen stands northeast of the house. Southeast of the house are several 19th-century outbuildings and a barn.

Bostwick was listed on the National Register of Historic Places in 1975. The house suffered damage to the north chimney and roof in the August 2011 east coast earthquake. In 2012, Preservation Maryland placed Bostwick on its list of threatened historic properties.
