= Halcyon House =

Historic house in Washington, D.C., United States

- U.S. National Register of Historic Places
- D.C. Inventory of Historic Sites
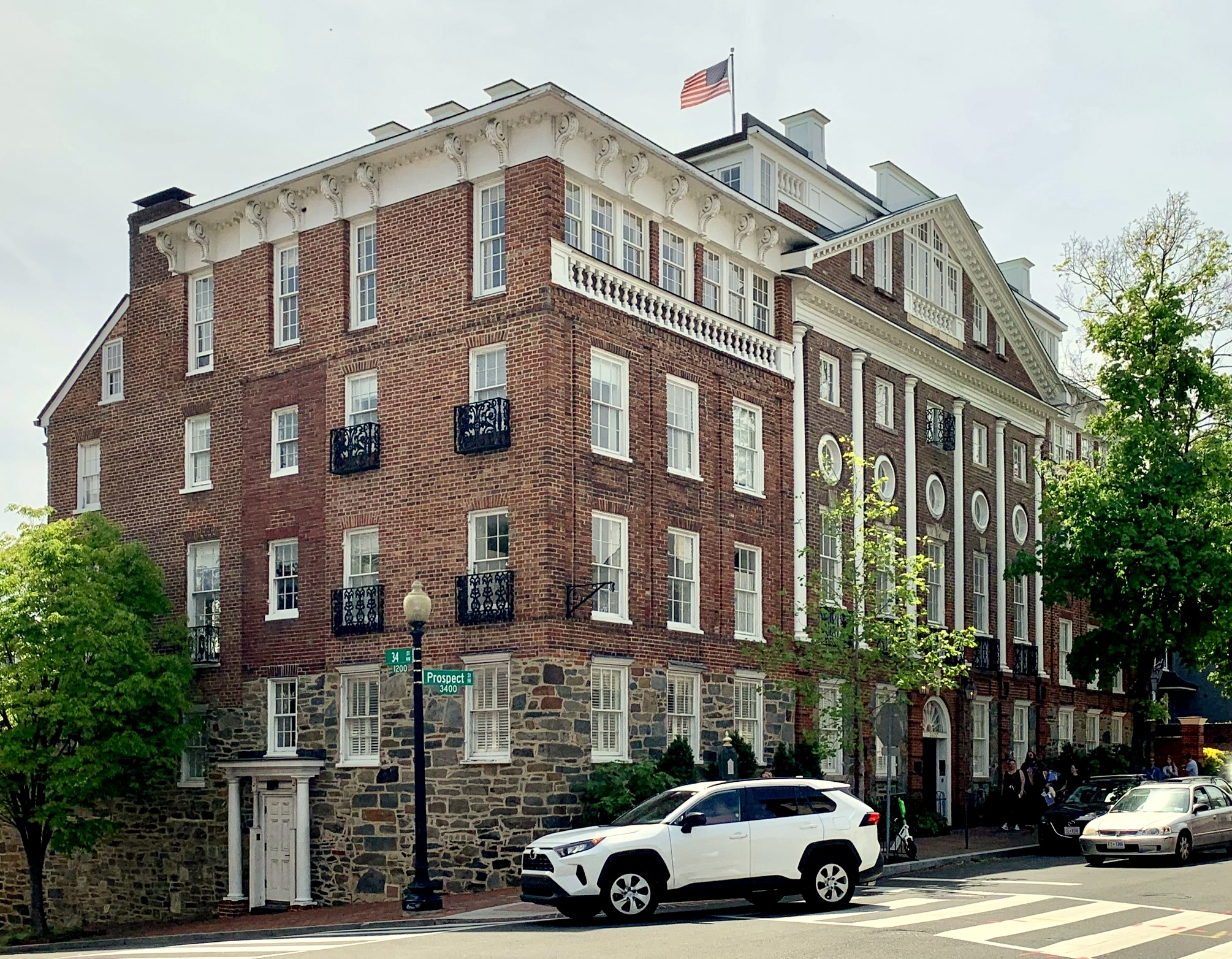
- Halcyon House in 2022

- Location within Washington, D.C.
- Location: 3400 Prospect Street NW; Washington, D.C.
- Nearest city: Washington, D.C.
- Coordinates: 38°54′20.7″N 77°4′5″W
- Built: 1787
- Architect: Benjamin Stoddert
- Architectural style: Federal
- NRHP reference No.: 71001002

Significant dates
- Added to NRHP: March 31, 1971
- Designated DCIHS: November 8, 1964

Halcyon House is a Federal-style home in Washington, D.C. Located in the center of Georgetown, the house was built beginning in 1787 by the first Secretary of the Navy, Benjamin Stoddert. Its gardens were designed by Pierre L'Enfant, and for several decades in the early 19th century Halcyon House was the center of much of Washington's social life.

== History ==
After the death of his wife and his finances declining, Stoddert transferred ownership of Halcyon House in 1802 to his daughter, Elizabeth Ewell, and her husband, Thomas. Thomas and Elizabeth's sixth child, Richard S. Ewell, was born in the house in 1817, and he went on to become a noted Confederate general during the American Civil War under Stonewall Jackson and Robert E. Lee. The Ewells vacated the home in 1818. A succession of owners had possession of the house over the next 80 years.

Halcyon House was sold in 1900 to Albert Clemens, a nephew of Mark Twain. The original structure was heavily altered over the next 38 years as Clemens renovated the house and added structures. Clemens believed that perpetually rebuilding the house would extend his life. The coach house was joined to the building, the north face and rear of the house added onto extensively with apartments, rooms were built within rooms, hallways added and then walled off, and even a small crypt added in one room. After Clemens' death, the house stood unoccupied for four years until purchased by Dorothy W. Sterling, the wife of the U.S. Ambassador to Sweden. Ownership changed again in 1951, and Georgetown University bought the property in 1961 and used it as a dormitory.

Halcyon House was purchased by architect Edmund Dreyfuss in 1966 and, as of 2009, was occupied by his son, noted sculptor John Dreyfuss. The historic home was extensively reconstructed from 1978 to 1995 to restore it to its original appearance. The house and grounds are listed on the National Register of Historic Places and during the period Dreyfuss maintained residency and ownership, served primarily as a venue for special events. Halcyon House was put on the market in 2008 for $30 million. It was re-listed in January 2010 and, as of September 20, 2010, had been on the market for 250 days and was listed at $19.5 million.

In November 2011 the Halcyon House sold for a price of $11 million to Dr. Sachiko Kuno, and Dr. Ryuji Ueno, just two weeks after the price was lowered from $15 million. The house was used as headquarters for Halcyon, a non-profit whose mission is to "accelerate the impact-driven future of business", from 2014 to 2026

In 2026, Halcyon House was acquired by Washington Commanders owner Joshua Harris, who, as of January 2026, plans to use it as a single-family house.
