= St. Matthew's Church (Seat Pleasant, Maryland) =

Historic church in Maryland, United States

- U.S. National Register of Historic Places
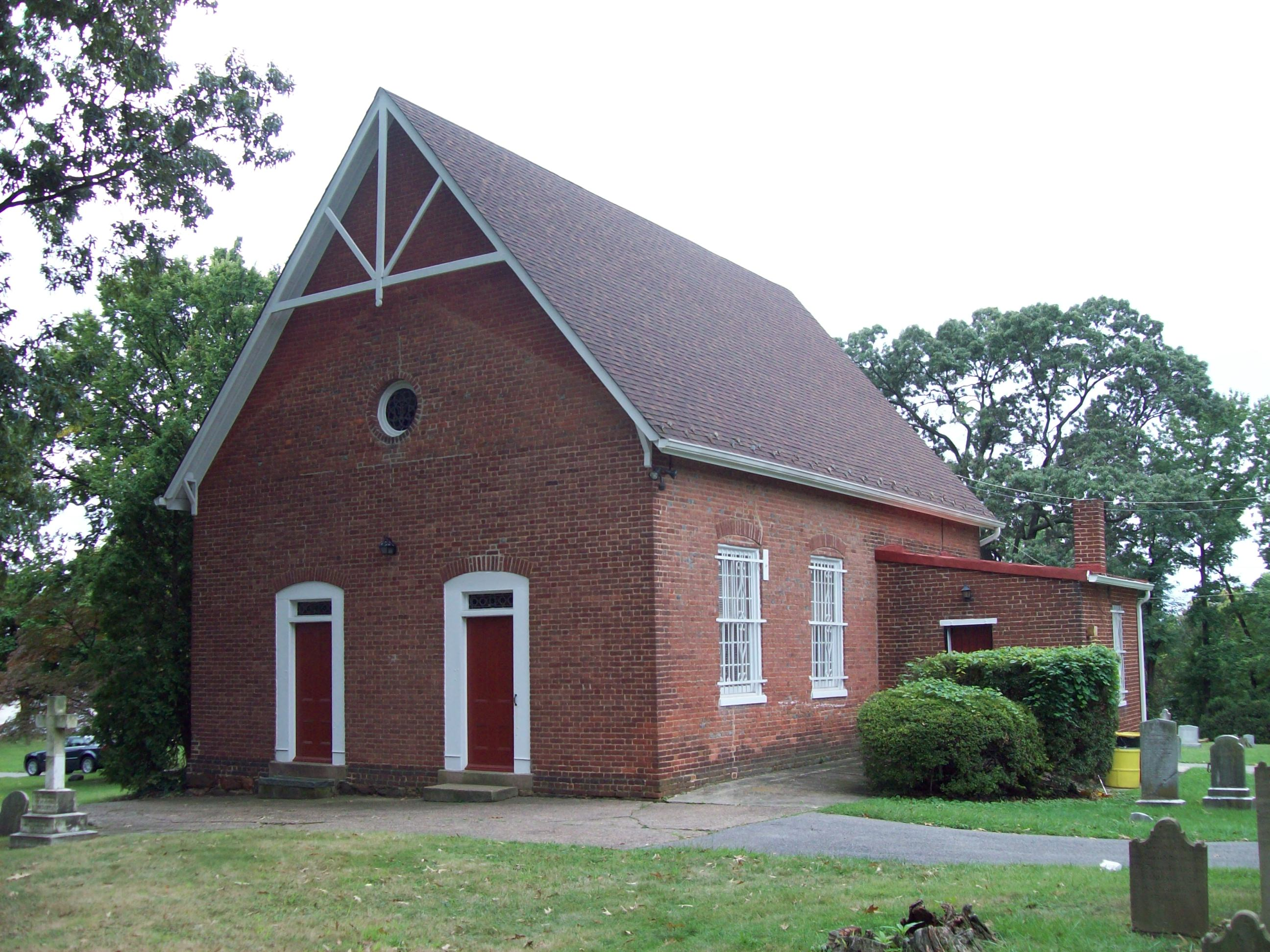
- St. Matthew's Church, September 2009

- Location within Maryland Location within the United States
- Location: Addison Rd. and 62nd Pl., Seat Pleasant, Maryland
- Coordinates: 38°54′6″N 76°54′34″W
- Area: 16 acres (6.5 ha)
- Built: 1809
- Architectural style: Gothic Revival
- NRHP reference No.: 72001481
- Added to NRHP: April 10, 1972

St. Matthew's Church, also known as Addison Chapel, is a historic Episcopal church located at Seat Pleasant, Prince George's County, Maryland.

Addison Chapel was first established in 1696 as a chapel of ease for St. John's at Broad Creek. The parish it served was one of the thirty original Maryland parishes and was named for Colonel John Addison, of Oxon Hill plantation, a leading proponent of the Anglican Church. His descendant Walter Dulaney Addison, who was for a term Chaplain of the Senate also served as rector here. It is also associated with the Pinkney, Dulany, Lowndes, and Calvert families.

In 1983, the vestry voted to vacate the structure and form Holy Redeemer Episcopal Church in Landover. The chapel was not convenient to where the parishioners lived, and a covenant placed by the Maryland Historical Trust barred the installation of indoor plumbing. The Episcopal Diocese of Washington agreed to continue weekly services for another five years, which ended in 1988.

== Architecture ==
Although the current chapel (the third on this site) was built about 1809, its simple Anglican styling reflects the Colonial-era, Church of England-influenced designs, of which few remain. The church is a small one-story rectangular brick building laid in Flemish bond.

St. Matthew's is situated in a large graveyard containing some early stones, the most notable being that of Benjamin Stoddert, the first Secretary of the Navy.

It was listed on the National Register of Historic Places in 1972.
