= Hilltop Manor (Bladensburg, Maryland) =

- U.S. National Register of Historic Places
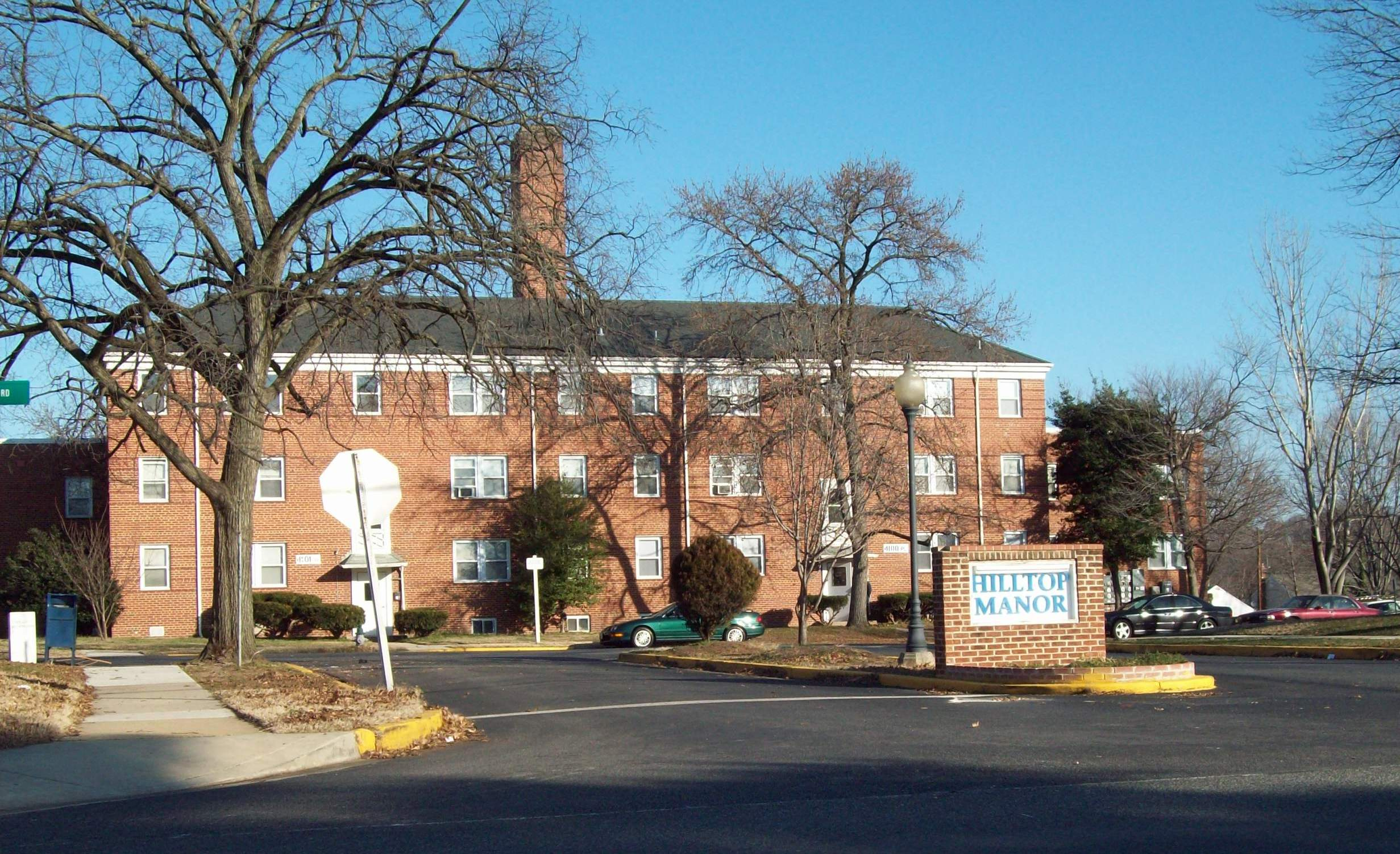
- Entrance to Hilltop Manor Apartments, December 2008

- Location within Maryland
- Location: 4100-4112, 4200-4214 53rd Ave., 4100-4210 53rd Pl., & 5300-5304 Annapolis Rd., Bladensburg, Maryland
- Coordinates: 38°56′33″N 76°55′46″W
- Area: 5.6 acres (2.3 ha)
- Built: 1942
- Architect: Ross & Walton
- Architectural style: Colonial Revival, Moderne
- NRHP reference No.: 07001288
- Added to NRHP: December 21, 2007

Hilltop Manor is a historic apartment complex located in Bladensburg, Prince George's County, Maryland. The complex consists of eight brick garden apartment buildings, each of which is divided into two to six units or sections, constructed in 1942 and 1943.

The structures exhibit characteristics of both the Colonial Revival and Moderne style, reflecting an architectural transition between the traditional elements of the Colonial Revival style and the streamlined features of the Moderne style.

The complex consists of 150 apartments interspersed among eight buildings with 32 units. Each unit contains between four and eight apartments, with the exception of one unit, 5210 53rd Place, which consists of only three apartments. In all, there are five apartment layouts with varying numbers of bedrooms. The majority of the apartments (122) have one bedroom. The remaining apartments consist of two-bedroom apartments; there is one three-bedroom basement apartment. The five basic apartment types, excluding the one three-bedroom apartment, consist of one-bedroom apartments with eat-in kitchens; one-bedroom apartments with separate dining rooms; L-shaped one-bedroom apartments; two-bedroom apartments; and duplex apartments. Despite minor renovations, the interior configurations of the apartments have remained intact.

It was one of the first garden-apartment complexes constructed in the county as a result of the population increase of the Washington metropolitan area during World War II. Hilltop Manor was financed under Section 608 Title VI of the National Housing Act, the primary vehicle for World War II Defense Housing and Federal Housing Administration (FHA) financing. Thus, Hilltop Manor, intended as permanent housing, illustrates the size, scale, and design of garden-apartment complexes constructed during World War II, which was often characterized by temporary housing developments. Hilltop Manor, surrounded by the established streetcar suburb of Defense Heights and adjacent to the new Bladensburg Elementary School, was an alternative to the single-family dwellings in the area and was ideal for young middle-class families. Its location along Defense Highway, which opened in 1927, heightened convenience to Washington, D.C. It is one of the first garden-apartment complexes designed by accomplished local architects Ross & Walton.

It was listed on the National Register of Historic Places in 2007.
