= William Hilleary House (Bladensburg, Maryland) =

Historic house in Maryland, United States

- U.S. National Register of Historic Places
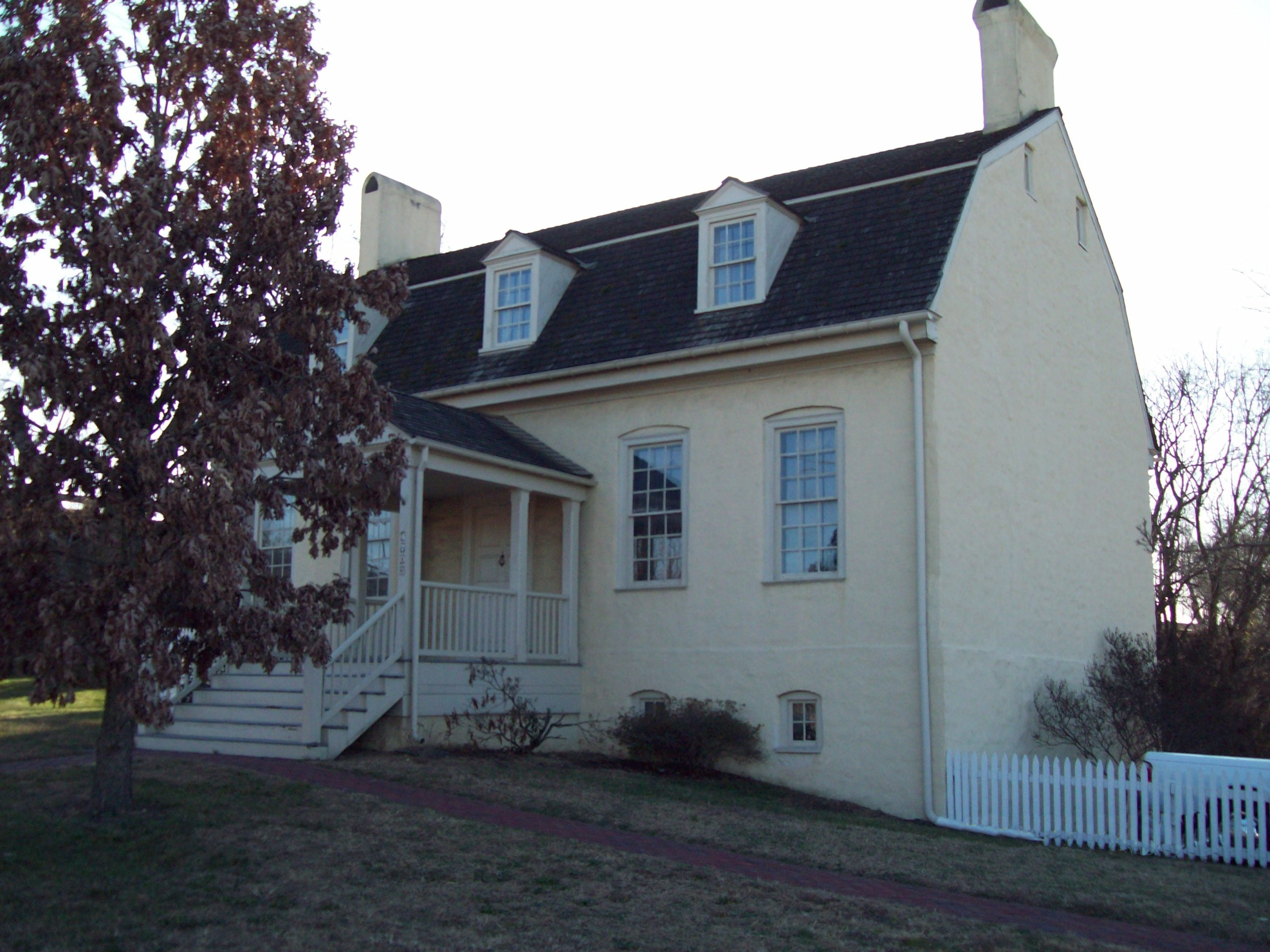
- William Hilleary House, December 2008

- Location within District of Columbia
- Location: 4703 Annapolis Rd., Bladensburg, Maryland
- Coordinates: 38°56′20″N 76°56′16″W
- Area: 0.7 acres (0.28 ha)
- Built: 1742
- NRHP reference No.: 78003116
- Added to NRHP: July 20, 1978

The William Hilleary House, or Hilleary-Magruder House, is a historic home located at Bladensburg in Prince George's County, Maryland, United States. The house is the only 18th-century stone, gambrel-roofed house in Prince George's County. It is now surrounded to the south and west by an exit ramp connecting Kenilworth Avenue with Annapolis Road.

It was built between 1742 and 1764 by William Hilleary. The house passed through a number of 18th-century owners, including Richard Henderson. Henderson was a prominent merchant and land speculator, who served as a County Justice and was well known for his "paper wars" in local newspapers. George Washington's diary, May 9, 1787, states that he dined at Richard Henderson's in Bladensburgh. Henderson sold the property in 1793 to Major David Ross, son of the surgeon and merchant Dr. David Ross, as well as business partner of Henderson's in the Frederick Forge on Antietam Creek. Ross' father, Dr. David Ross, was the "Agent Victualer" for the Maryland troops during the French and Indian War. Father Dr. David Ross owned the famed "Ross Home", which was often referred to as the old brick hospital. In August 1814, the Ross Home was used for a hospital during the Battle of Bladensburg of the War of 1812. Dr. Ross was an original inhabitant of Bladensburg, had served as a Town Commissioner, and from 1750 to 1759 had been a Justice of the County Court.

The William Hilleary House was listed on the National Register of Historic Places in 1978. In 1979 Prince George's Heritage, Inc., took on the ownership and restoration of the Hilleary-Magruder House.
