= Last Stop Vienna =

2003 novel by Andrew Nagorski

- Author: Andrew Nagorski
- Language: English
- Genre: sensational novel
- Publisher: Simon & Schuster
- Publication date: 2003
- Publication place: United States
- Media type: Print hardcover

Last Stop Vienna is a sensational novel by Andrew Nagorski about the early years of the Nazi movement in Germany, published in 2003 by Simon & Schuster in the United States.

== Plot ==
Last Stop Vienna is a combination of fiction, fact-based novel and alternate history. The protagonist, the young German Karl Naumann, comes into contact with a group of right-wing youths and Freikorps units in post-war Berlin after the loss of his father and brother, who were killed in World War I. His mentor Otto Strasser sends him to Munich, where he is to make contact with the nascent National Socialist movement and its leader Adolf Hitler. In Bavaria, Karl Naumann gets close to the SA and Hitler Youth structures, and meets prominent Nazi activists. One of these is Gregor Strasser, Otto's brother, who actively and unreservedly commits himself to the NSDAP side, while Otto is more critical of Hitler and wishes to remain independent.

In addition to the political themes, the novel also contains emotional ones – a description of the protagonist's maturation process and his relationships with women. Against this background also appears the character of Geli Raubal, Hitler's niece, and her complex and tragic relationship with Hitler.

== Reception ==
According to Publishers Weekly:

A former Berlin bureau chief for Newsweek, Nagorski captures the city faithfully, convincingly imagining the to and fro of everyday life in the 1920s. The book offers a fascinating account of the power struggles between Hitler and rival Nazi leaders, but focuses primarily on the small events and individual actions that lay the foundation for Nazi rule.
