= Bladensburg, Maryland =

Bladensburg
- Town
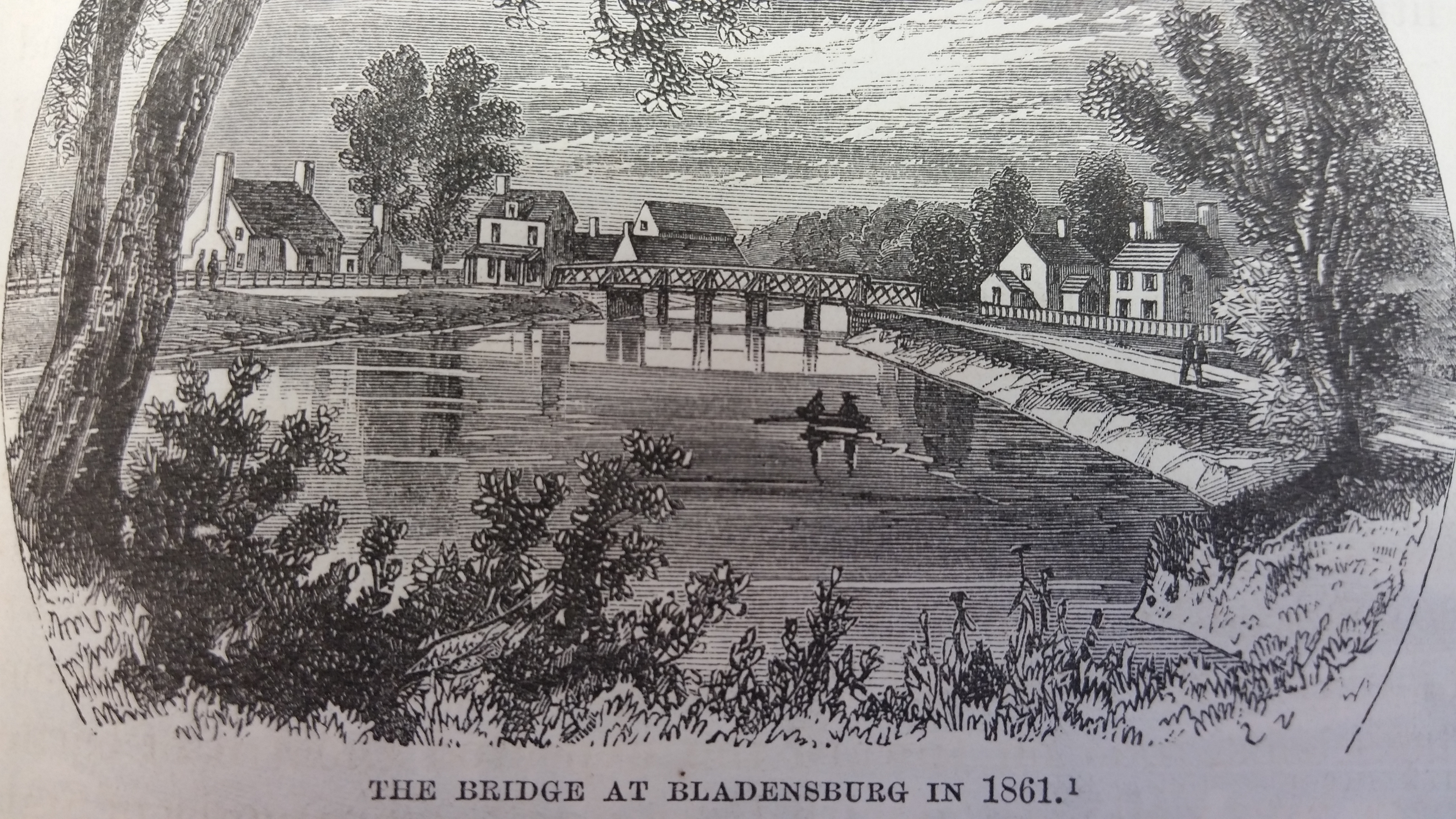
- Bladensburg in 1861

- Flag Seal
- Motto: A past to remember, a future to embrace.
- Location of Bladensburg, Maryland
- Coordinates: 38°56′29″N 76°55′48″W
- Country: United States
- State: Maryland
- County: Prince George's
- Founded: 1742
- Incorporated: 1854
- Named for: Thomas Bladen

Area
  - Total: 1.00 sq mi (2.59 km^{2})
  - Land: 0.99 sq mi (2.56 km^{2})
  - Water: 0.0077 sq mi (0.02 km^{2})
- Elevation: 52 ft (16 m)

Population (2020)
  - Total: 9,657
  - Density: 9,752.9/sq mi (3,765.61/km^{2})
- Time zone: UTC-5 (Eastern (EST))
  - Summer (DST): UTC-4 (EDT)
- ZIP code: 20710
- Area codes: 301, 240
- FIPS code: 24-07850
- GNIS feature ID: 0597086
- Website: bladensburgmd.gov

Bladensburg is a town in Prince George's County, Maryland, United States. The population was 9,657 at the 2020 census. Areas in Bladensburg are located within ZIP code 20710.

== History ==
Originally called Garrison's Landing, Bladensburg was renamed in honor of Thomas Bladen, governor of Maryland, 1742–1747. Bladensburg was established in 1742 as a regional commercial center by an act of the Maryland General Assembly. The act also authorized the town commissioners to purchase 60 acres (240,000 m^{2}) of land to be laid out in 1-acre (4,000 m^{2}) lots. The act required that a house covering at least 400 square feet (37 m^{2}) of ground with a brick or stone chimney be constructed within 18 months of the sale of the lot. As of June 6, 1746, only 18 of the lots had been improved according to the stipulations of the act. Christopher Lowndes' house, Bostwick, and those built by David Ross and William Hilleary (the William Hilleary House) were among them.

=== Port, war, and railroad (1740s–1830s) ===
With the establishment in 1747 of a government tobacco inspection system, Bladensburg became a designated tobacco inspection and grading port. The Market Master's House is evidence of that role. The town was a seaport during the colonial period.

Bladensburg is best remembered for the Battle of Bladensburg (1814) during the War of 1812, the only battle in US history in which a sitting president (James Madison) rode into battle. The U.S. defeat in the battle, called "the greatest disgrace ever dealt to American arms", cleared the way for the burning of Washington by British troops.

Its role as a seaport faded as the Anacostia River silted up and larger ships could no longer reach the port. However, the town remained an important crossroads of routes north to Baltimore and Philadelphia, south and east to the towns of Annapolis and Upper Marlboro, and west to the District of Columbia. The original terminus of the Baltimore and Ohio Railroad was Bladensburg, forcing all passengers intended for Washington to board carriages to continue on into the city. A sharp decline of passengers was experienced in Bladensburg when an extension of the B&O was permitted into the District of Columbia in 1835.

=== 1840s–present ===
Bladensburg remained a small town throughout the rest of the 19th century with modest development and infrastructure improvements. A major attraction in Bladensburg from the 18th century through the 20th century was the Spa Springs. Thought to be a cure for various illnesses, the springs attracted visitors from throughout the region and was reachable by the Washington, Spa Spring and Gretta Railroad. Another attraction was the Bladensburg Dueling Grounds or Dueling Creek, the site of many famous duels until after the Civil War.

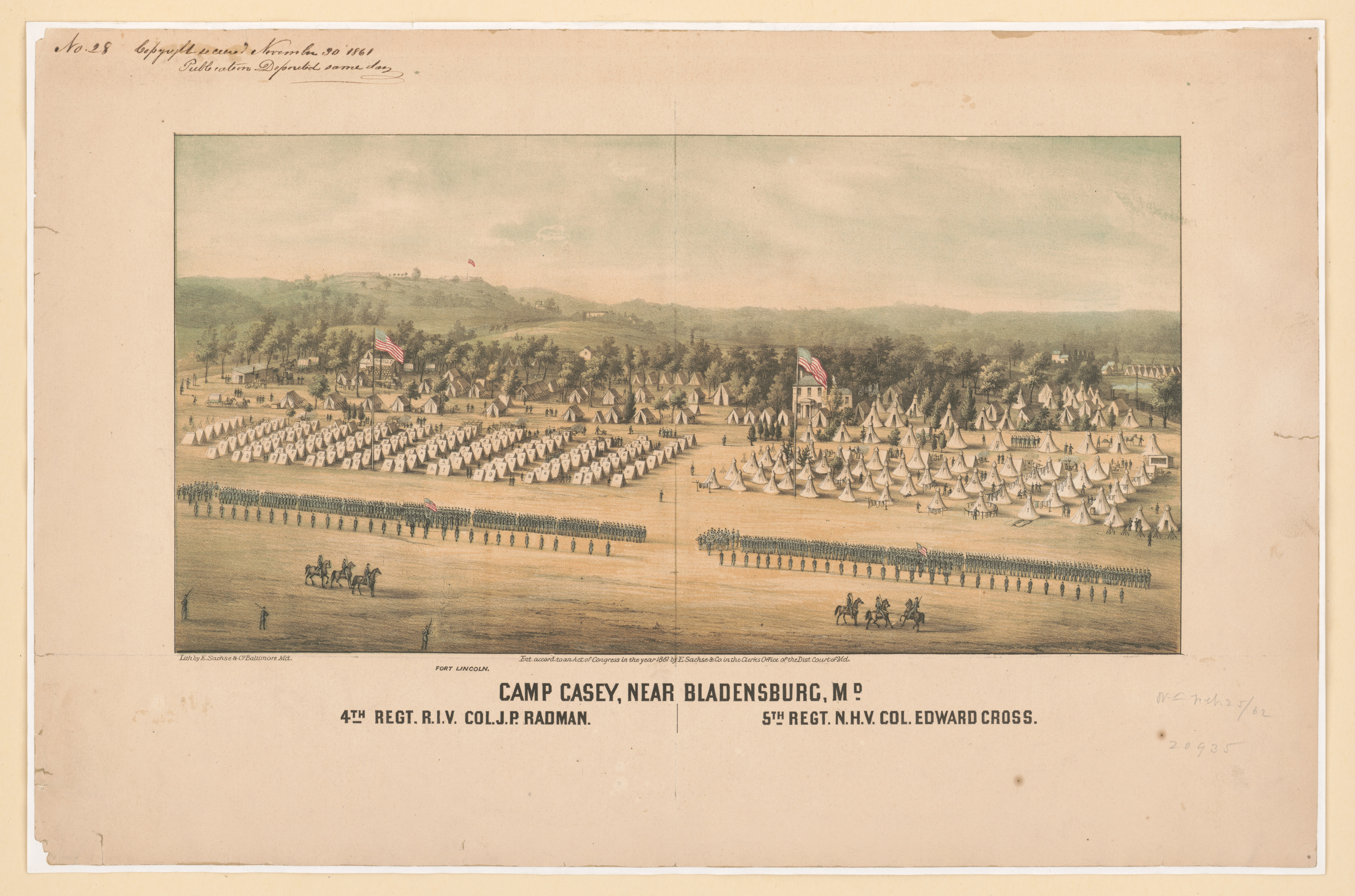
Camp Casey near Bladensburg, 1861

The town was incorporated in 1854. Schools and churches were constructed, including the first Freedmen's Bureau school for African Americans in 1866. The town experienced its most significant growth in the early 20th century with the construction of the first two residential sections of the town in 1914 and 1917. Named Decatur Heights, the subdivisions had gridded streets platted on the north and south sides of Annapolis Road. The town was enlarged again in 1947 by the Sunnybrook subdivision. The mid to late 20th century brought additional residential construction in the form of single-family houses and apartment complexes, as well as the construction of the Bladensburg Shopping Center. After a history major flooding, the Army Corps of Engineers implemented a flood control system around this time which altered the course of the Anacostia River and added levees.

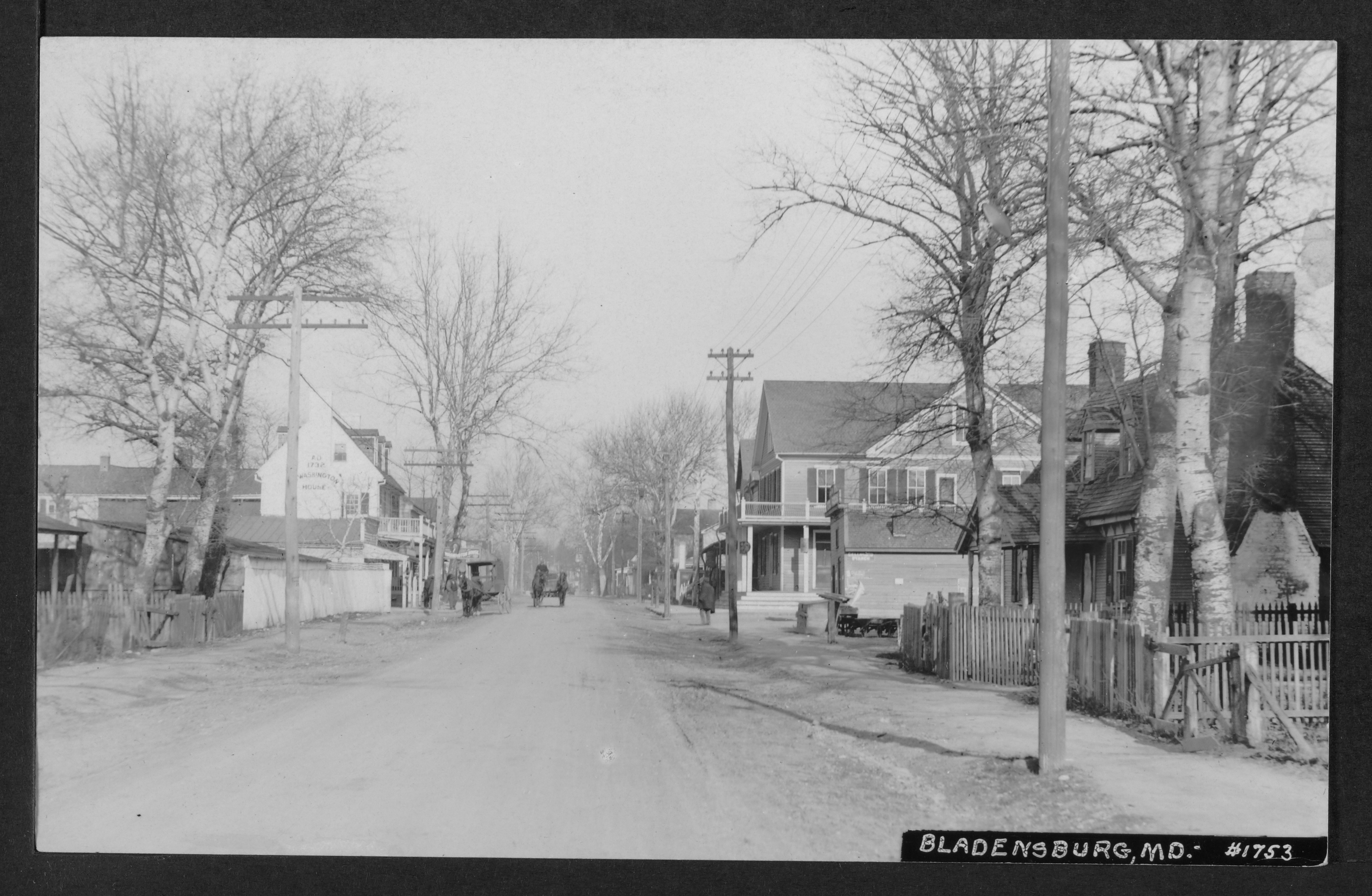
Image depicting Baltimore Ave in the early 20th century

In 1999, Bladensburg, Colmar Manor, and Cottage City were lauded by the Joint Center for Sustainable Communities for their collaboration with Prince George's County for the Port Towns Revitalization Initiative, which created a common Port Towns identity for the towns; encouraged businesses development through infrastructure and façade improvements; acquisition of historic properties and plans for their reuse; and reconstruction of the Bladensburg waterfront and marina.

== Historic sites ==
The following is a partial list of historic sites in Bladensburg identified by the Maryland-National Capital Park and Planning Commission:

	Site name	Image	Location	M-NCPPC Inventory Number	Comment
1	Bostwick		3901 48th St.	69-005-09	Added to the National Register of Historic Places, 1975-08-19
2	George Washington House		Baltimore Ave. at Upshur St.	69-005-02	Added to the National Register of Historic Places, 1974-08-07
3	Hilltop Manor		4100–4112, 4200–4214 53rd Ave., 4100–4210 53rd Pl., & 5300–5304 Annapolis Rd.	n/a	Added to the National Register of Historic Places, 2007-12-21
4	Market Master's House		4006 48th St.	69-005-08	Added to the National Register of Historic Places, 1990-03-29
6	William Hilleary House or Hilleary–Magruder House		4703 Annapolis Rd.	69-005-07	Added to the National Register of Historic Places, 1978-07-20

Bladensburg is also the site of the Peace Cross, a World War I memorial at the center of a 2019 Supreme Court case American Legion v. American Humanist Association, which allowed the landmark to remain as a state-maintained monument.

== Geography ==
Bladensburg is located at 38°56′29″N 76°55′48″W (38.941428, −76.930053). According to the United States Census Bureau, the town has a total area of 1.01 square miles (2.62 km^{2}), of which 1.00 square mile (2.59 km^{2}) is land and 0.01 square miles (0.03 km^{2}) is water.

The community is home to the "Bladensburg Waterfront Park" at the confluence of the Northeast Branch and Northwest Branch of the Anacostia River.

=== Bordering areas ===
- Edmonston (northwest)
- Hyattsville (northwest)
- Rogers Heights (northeast)
- Riverdale (northeast)
- Cottage City (southwest)
- Colmar Manor (southwest)
- Cheverly (southeast)
- Tuxedo (south)
- Woodlawn (east)
- Landover Hills (east)

== Demographics ==
Historical population
Census	Pop.	Note	%±
1870	410		—
1880	466		13.7%
1890	503		7.9%
1900	463		−8.0%
1910	460		−0.6%
1920	597		29.8%
1930	816		36.7%
1940	1,220		49.5%
1950	2,899		137.6%
1960	3,103		7.0%
1970	7,977		157.1%
1980	7,691		−3.6%
1990	8,064		4.8%
2000	7,661		−5.0%
2010	9,148		19.4%
2020	9,657		5.6%
U.S. Decennial Census; 2010 2020

=== Racial and ethnic composition ===
Bladensburg town, Maryland – Racial and ethnic composition Note: the US Census treats Hispanic/Latino as an ethnic category. This table excludes Latinos from the racial categories and assigns them to a separate category. Hispanics/Latinos may be of any race.
Race / Ethnicity (NH = Non-Hispanic)	Pop 2000	Pop 2010	Pop 2020	% 2000	% 2010	% 2020
White alone (NH)	917	460	294	11.97%	5.03%	3.04%
Black or African American alone (NH)	5,369	5,885	5,166	70.08%	64.33%	53.49%
Native American or Alaska Native alone (NH)	21	18	23	0.27%	0.20%	0.24%
Asian alone (NH)	193	184	124	2.52%	2.01%	1.28%
Native Hawaiian or Pacific Islander alone (NH)	3	2	5	0.04%	0.02%	0.05%
Other race alone (NH)	12	19	37	0.16%	0.21%	0.38%
Mixed race or Multiracial (NH)	145	117	196	1.89%	1.28%	2.03%
Hispanic or Latino (any race)	1,001	2,463	3,812	13.07%	26.92%	39.47%
Total	7,661	9,148	9,657	100.00%	100.00%	100.00%

=== 2020 census ===
As of the 2020 census, Bladensburg had a population of 9,657. The median age was 33.7 years. 26.6% of residents were under the age of 18, and 11.0% were 65 years of age or older. For every 100 females, there were 90.5 males, and for every 100 females age 18 and over, there were 86.3 males.

100.0% of residents lived in urban areas, while 0.0% lived in rural areas.

There were 3,639 households in Bladensburg, of which 36.2% had children under the age of 18 living in them. Of all households, 26.0% were married-couple households, 25.1% were households with a male householder and no spouse or partner present, and 41.5% were households with a female householder and no spouse or partner present. About 37.5% of all households were made up of individuals, and 13.5% had someone living alone who was 65 years of age or older.

There were 3,819 housing units, of which 4.7% were vacant. The homeowner vacancy rate was 2.2%, and the rental vacancy rate was 3.9%.

=== 2010 census ===
As of the census of 2010, there were 9,148 people, 3,542 households, and 1,960 families living in the town. The population density was 9,148.0 inhabitants per square mile (3,532.1/km^{2}). There were 3,826 housing units at an average density of 3,826.0 per square mile (1,477.2/km^{2}). The racial makeup of the town was 12.6% White, 65.6% African American, 0.5% Native American, 2.0% Asian, 16.6% from other races, and 2.7% from two or more races. Hispanic or Latino of any race were 26.9% of the population.

There were 3,542 households, of which 36.2% had children under the age of 18 living with them, 25.7% were married couples living together, 22.4% had a female householder with no husband present, 7.2% had a male householder with no wife present, and 44.7% were non-families. 37.0% of all households were made up of individuals, and 12.7% had someone living alone who was 65 years of age or older. The average household size was 2.58 and the average family size was 3.39.

The median age in the town was 31.5 years. 26.8% of residents were under the age of 18; 11% were between the ages of 18 and 24; 32.7% were from 25 to 44; 20.3% were from 45 to 64; and 9.4% were 65 years of age or older. The gender makeup of the town was 46.9% male and 53.1% female.

=== 2000 census ===
As of the census of 2000, there were 7,661 people, 3,121 households, and 1,719 families living in the town. The population density was 7,766.1 inhabitants per square mile (2,998.5/km^{2}). There were 3,443 housing units at an average density of 3,490.3 per square mile (1,347.6/km^{2}). The racial makeup of the town was 16.42% White, 70.92% African American, 0.34% Native American, 2.52% Asian, 0.05% Pacific Islander, 6.87% from other races, and 2.88% from two or more races. Hispanic or Latino of any race were 13.07% of the population.

There were 3,121 households, out of which 31.0% had children under the age of 18 living with them, 27.8% were married couples living together, 20.7% had a female householder with no husband present, and 44.9% were non-families. 37.6% of all households were made up of individuals, and 10.6% had someone living alone who was 65 years of age or older. The average household size was 2.45 and the average family size was 3.26.

In the town, the population was spread out, with 27.6% under the age of 18, 10.3% from 18 to 24, 34.0% from 25 to 44, 19.3% from 45 to 64, and 8.7% who were 65 years of age or older. The median age was 31 years. For every 100 females, there were 91.0 males. For every 100 females age 18 and over, there were 85.2 males.

The median income for a household in the town was $34,966, and the median income for a family was $41,394. Males had a median income of $30,969 versus $28,538 for females. The per capita income for the town was $17,046. About 7.5% of families and 11.8% of the population were below the poverty line, including 9.5% of those under age 18 and 21.3% of those age 65 or over.

== Education ==
=== Primary and secondary schools ===
==== Public schools ====
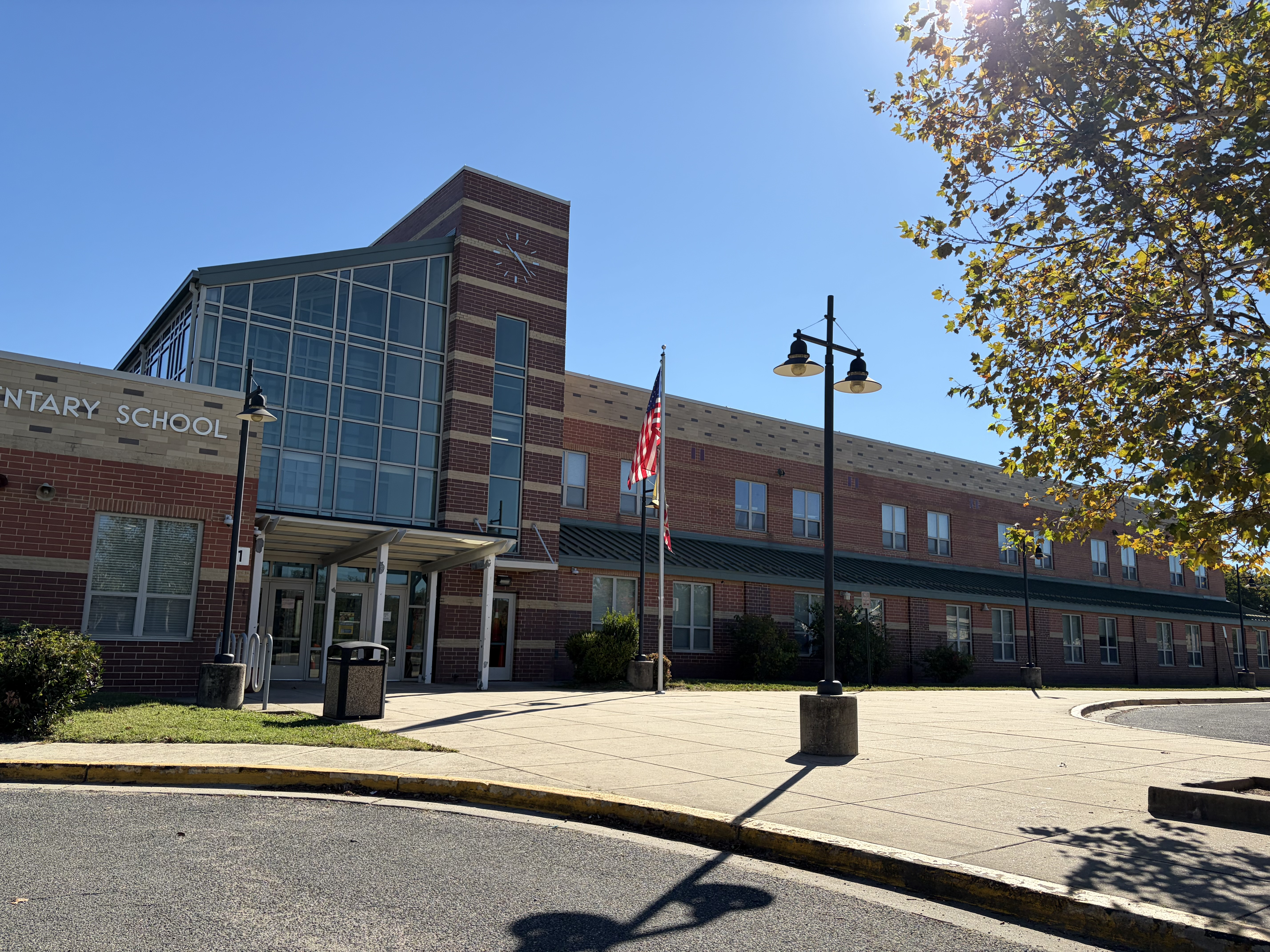
Port Towns Elementary School

Rogers Heights Elementary School

Bladensburg Elementary School

International High School at Langley Park

Bladensburg residents are zoned to schools in the Prince George's County Public Schools district.

Public elementary schools serving the town include:

- Bladensburg Elementary School
  - Bladensburg Elementary established an English as a second language (ESOL) program years prior to 2004. By that year about 33% of the students were designated as ESOL. As of that year special ESOL teachers visit classrooms and provide support to regular teachers.
- Port Towns Elementary School
- Rogers Heights Elementary School
- Templeton Elementary School

The zoned middle school is William Wirt Middle School. Bladensburg High School is the sole zoned high school of the town.

International High School at Langley Park: a special high school for students who are new immigrants to the United States.

==== Private schools ====
Elizabeth Seton High School, a private high school, is located in Bladensburg.

==== Public libraries ====
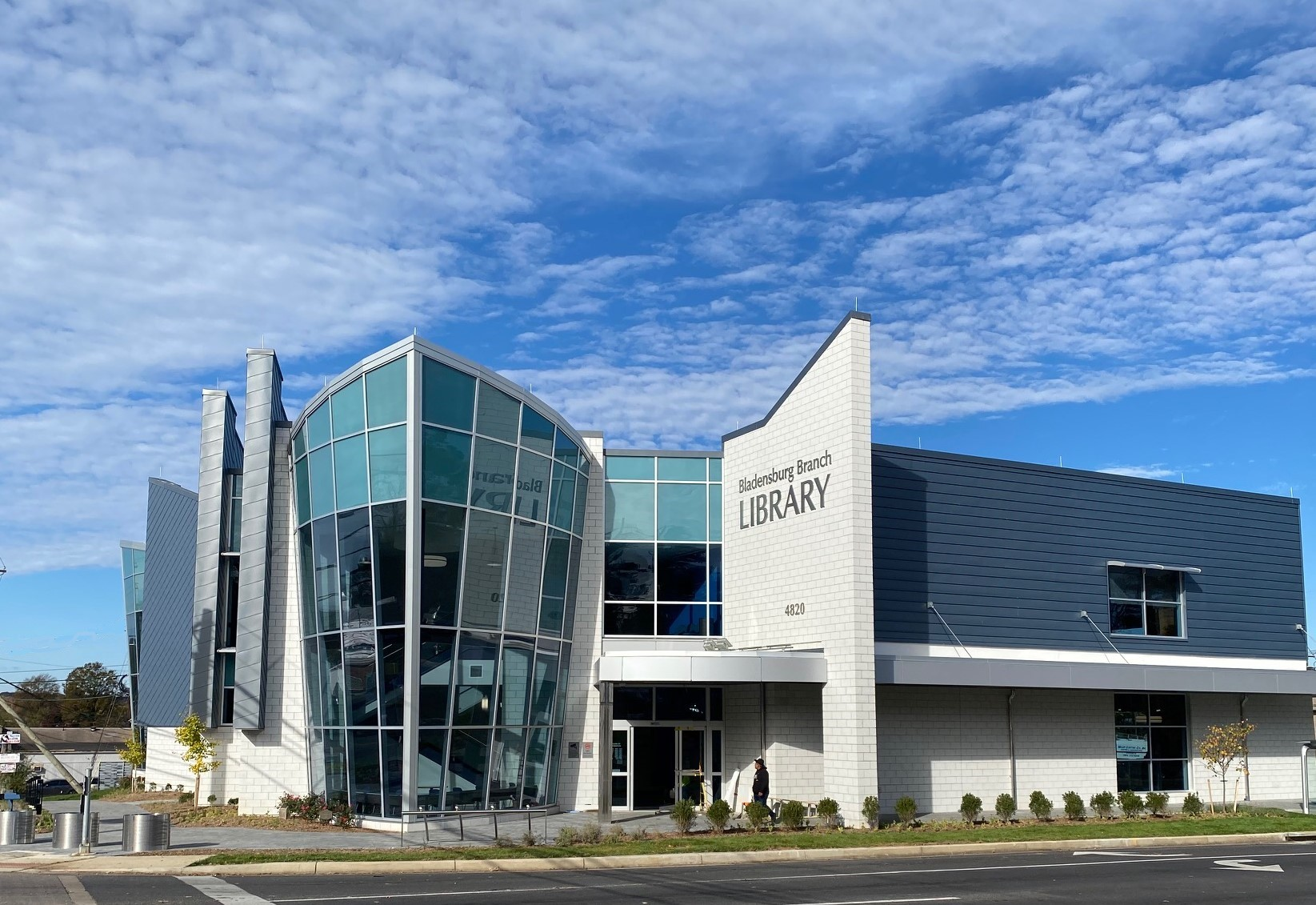
Bladensburg Branch Library

The Prince George's County Memorial Library System operates the Bladensburg Branch. The previous library, previously an elementary school, opened on October 21, 1978. The ribbon cutting of the current library was held in 2023.

== Transportation ==
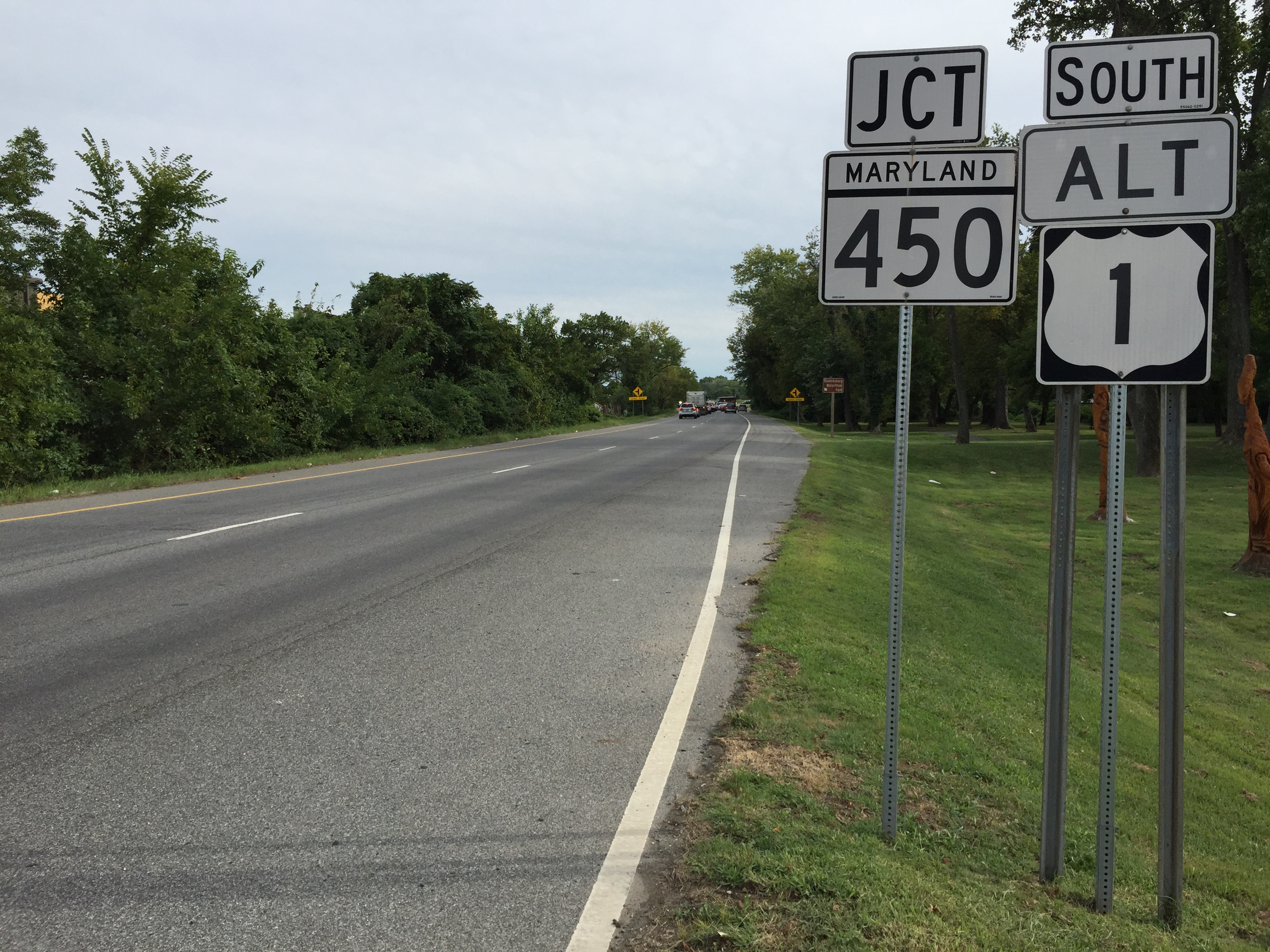
US 1 Alt approaching MD 450 in Bladensburg

Several major surface roads serve Bladensburg. U.S. Route 1 Alternate is the only U.S. Highway serving the town. It follows Baltimore Avenue along a northeast-southwest alignment on the west edge of town. Major state routes serving Bladensburg include Maryland Route 201, which follows Kenilworth Avenue on a general north-south alignment, and Maryland Route 450, which follows Annapolis Road on an east-west route. Maryland Route 202 reaches its northern terminus at MD 450 in Bladensburg, while Maryland Route 769 follows the old alignment of MD 201 along minor surface roads through town. The nearest freeway is the Baltimore-Washington Parkway, which passes just east of the town limits.

== Government ==
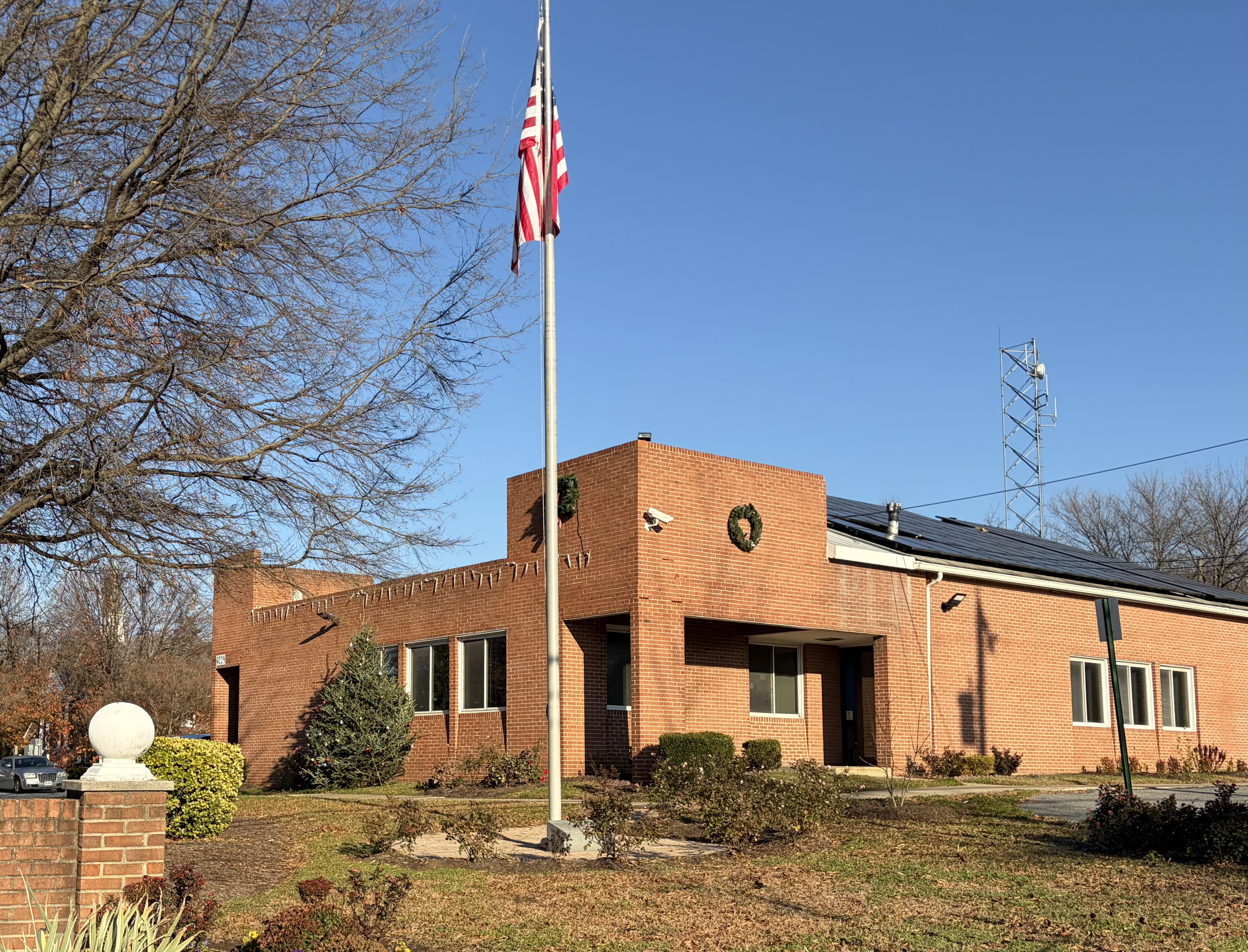
Bladensburg Town Hall

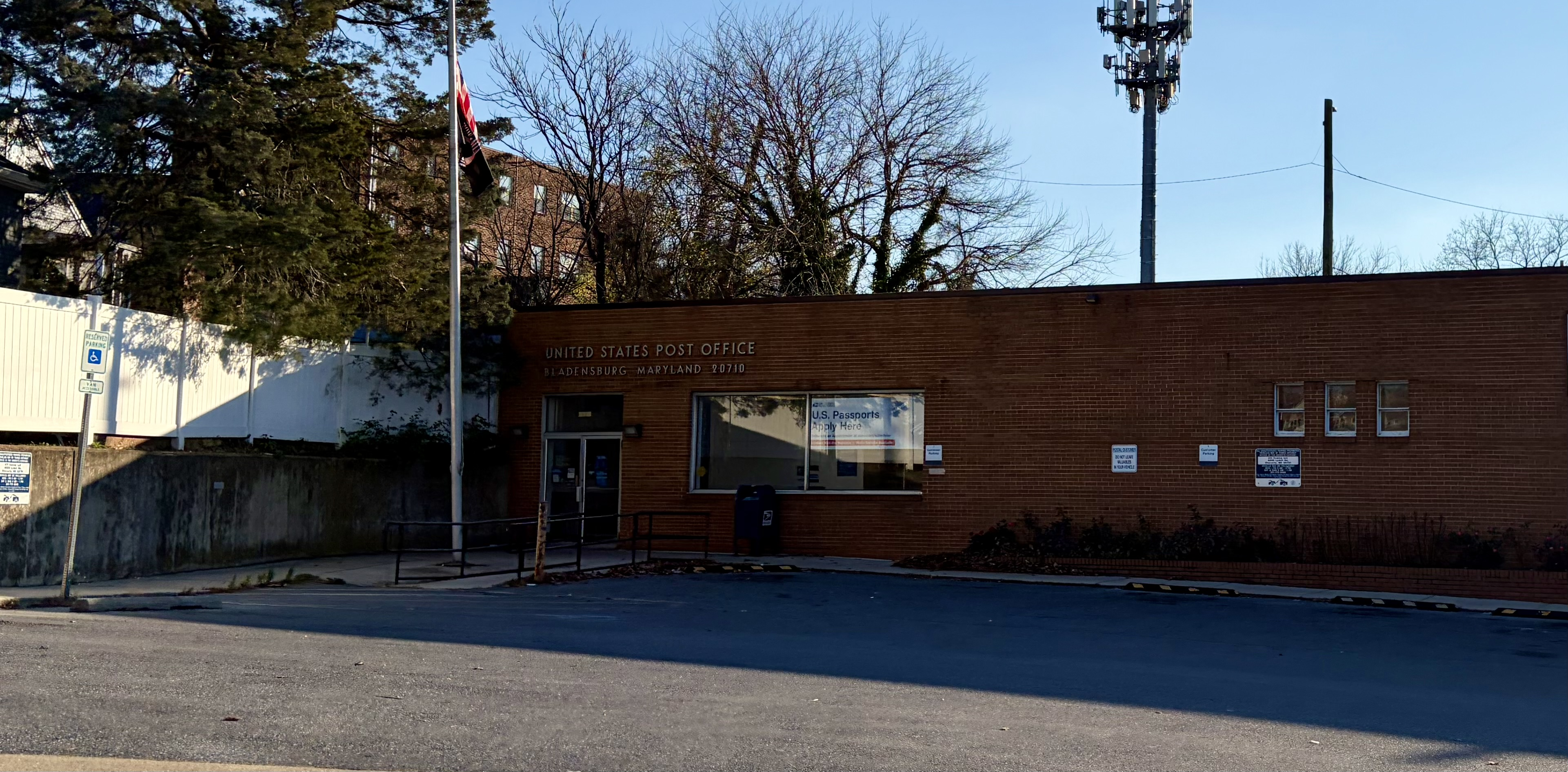
Bladensburg Post Office

Prince George's County Police Department District 1 Station in Hyattsville serves Bladensburg.

The United States Postal Service operates the Bladensburg Post Office.

== Notable people ==
- Caleb T. Bailey, born in Bladensburg in 1898; brigadier general, USMC
- Tracey Ballard, first open gay employee of the CIA
- Henry Hartley, born in Bladensburg in 1884; rear admiral, USN
- Robert M. Wright, born in Bladensburg in 1840; one of the founders of Dodge City, Kansas
