= Andrew Nagorski =

American journalist (born 1947)

- Born: 1947 (age 78–79); Edinburgh
- Education: Amherst College, University of Cracow
- Occupation: Journalist

Andrew Nagorski (born 1947) is an American journalist and author. He worked as a foreign correspondent and editor for Newsweek for over thirty years. From 2008 to 2014, he was vice-president and director of public policy for EastWest Institute. His most recent book, Saving Freud: The Rescuers Who Brought Him to Freedom, was published in 2022.

== Early life and education ==
Nagorski was born in Edinburgh, Scotland to Polish parents, Zygmunt Witold Nagorski Jr. and Maria Bogdaszewska in 1947. They then emigrated to the United States in 1948. He attended school overseas while his father was in the United States Foreign Service.

He earned a BA magna cum laude from Amherst College in 1969, and was admitted to Phi Beta Kappa. He also studied at the Jagiellonian University in Cracow. Prior to joining Newsweek, Nagorski taught social studies at Wayland High School in Massachusetts.

== Career ==
Nagorski joined Newsweek International in 1973 as an associate editor, later becoming its assistant managing editor from 1977 to 1978. From 1978 to 1980, Nagorski was the Hong Kong-based Asian regional editor for Newsweek International and then worked as Hong Kong Bureau Chief.

From 1990 to 1994, he served as Newsweek's Warsaw bureau chief, and was Newsweek's Moscow bureau chief in the early 1980s and again from 1995 to 1996. In 1982, the Soviet government, displeased with his reporting, expelled him from the country. After spending the next two and a half years as Rome bureau chief, he became Bonn bureau chief.

As Berlin bureau chief from 1996 to 1999, Nagorski reported on Germany's efforts to overcome the legacy of division, the immigration debate, and German-Jewish relations. Based in Berlin, Nagorski also covered Central Europe, drawing on his experience in the region and his knowledge of Polish, Russian, German and French.

In 1988, Nagorski took a one-year leave of absence to serve as a senior associate at the Carnegie Endowment for International Peace think tank in Washington, D.C.

From January 2000 to 2008, Nagorski was a senior editor for Newsweek in New York, after his time as a foreign correspondent and bureau chief in various cities. Nagorski worked to establish editorial collaboration between Newsweek International and its network of foreign-language editions and joint venture partners, including Newsweek Russia, which was launched in June 2004, and Newsweek Polska. From 2008 to April 2014, Nagorski served as Vice-President and Director of Public Policy at the EastWest Institute, where he focused on international relations and policy development. He also continues to write reviews and commentaries for Newsweek International. Nagorski has received three awards from the Overseas Press Club for his international reporting.

In 2014, former President of Poland Lech Walesa presented the "Lech Walesa Media Award" to Nagorski "for dedication to the cause of freedom and writing about Poland's history and culture."

== Literary works ==
External videos
- Booknotes interview with Nagorski on The Birth of Freedom, October 31, 1993, C-SPAN
- Presentation by Nagorski on Hitlerland, April 4, 2012, C-SPAN
- Q&A interview with Nagorski on Hitlerland, August 12, 2012, C-SPAN
- Presentation by Nagorski on The Nazi Hunters, May 16, 2016, C-SPAN
- Presentation by Nagorski on The Year Germany Lost the War, May 30, 2019, C-SPAN

=== Non-fiction ===
- Reluctant Farewell: An American Reporter’s Candid Look Inside the Soviet Union, New Republic/Henry Holt, 1985
- The Birth of Freedom: Shaping Lives and Societies in the New Eastern Europe, Simon & Schuster, 1993
- The Greatest Battle: Stalin, Hitler and the Desperate Struggle for Moscow That Changed the Course of World War II, Simon & Schuster, 2007
- Hitlerland: American Eyewitnesses to the Nazi Rise to Power, Simon & Schuster, 2012
- The Nazi Hunters, Simon & Schuster, 2016
- 1941: The Year Germany Lost the War, Simon & Schuster, 2019
- "Saving Freud: The Rescuers Who Brought Him to Freedom", Simon & Schuster, 2022

=== Fiction ===
Nagorski's first novel, Last Stop Vienna, about a young German who joins the early Nazi movement and then confronts Hitler, was published by Simon & Schuster in January 2003.

== Personal life ==
Nagorski resides in St. Augustine, Florida.
