= Robert M. Wright =

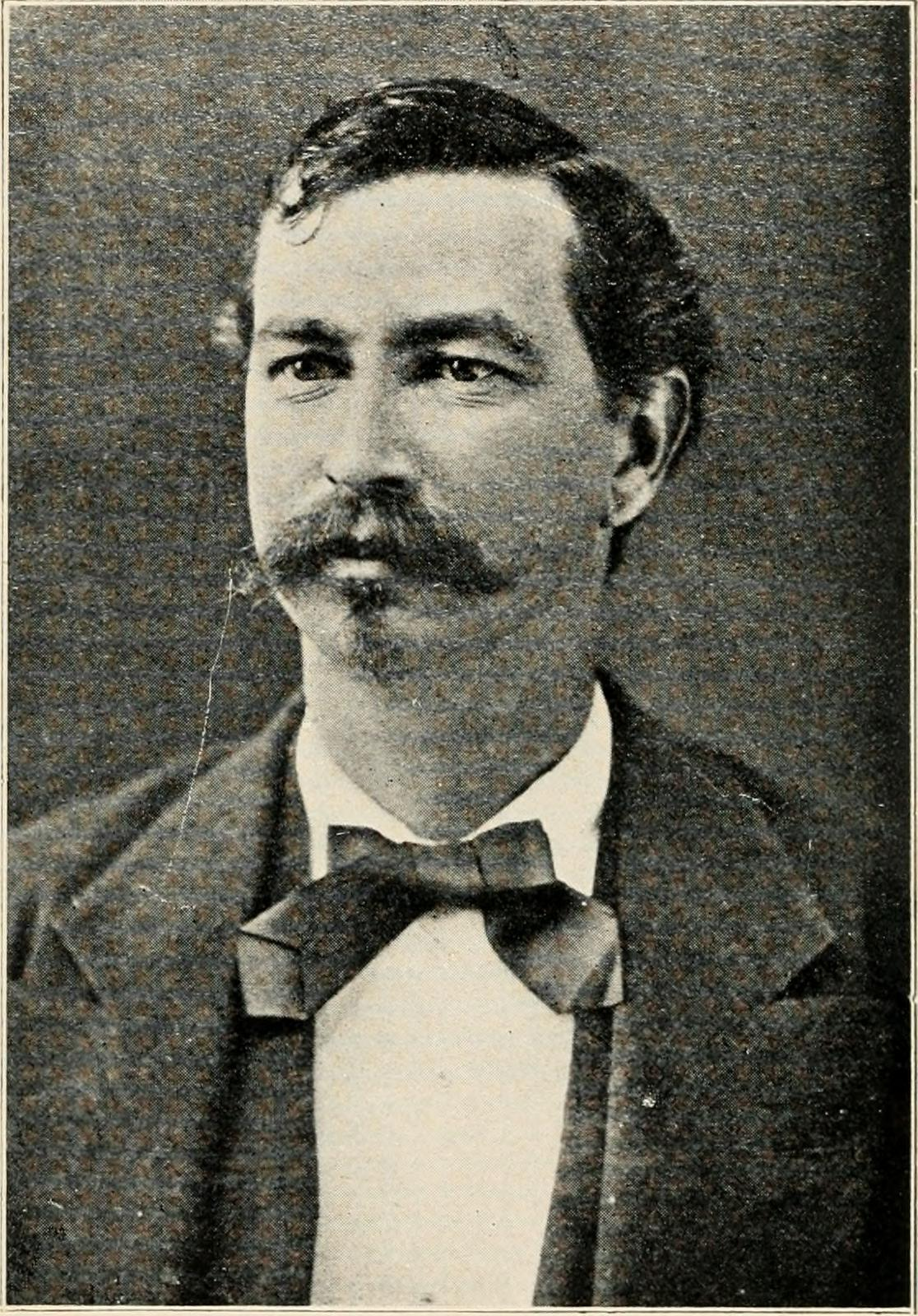
Wright in 1875

Robert Marr Wright (1840 - January 4, 1915) was an American pioneer, businessman, and politician. He served as the mayor of Dodge City, Kansas, and served in the Kansas Legislature. In 1913, Wright wrote the book Dodge City.

In 1998, The Merchant Prince of Dodge City: The Life and Times of Robert M. Wright by C. Robert Haywood was published by University of Oklahoma Press. Wright Park is named after him.

== See also ==
- List of mayors of Dodge City, Kansas
