= David Kimche =

Israeli diplomat and deputy-director of Mossad (1928–2010)

- דוד קמחי
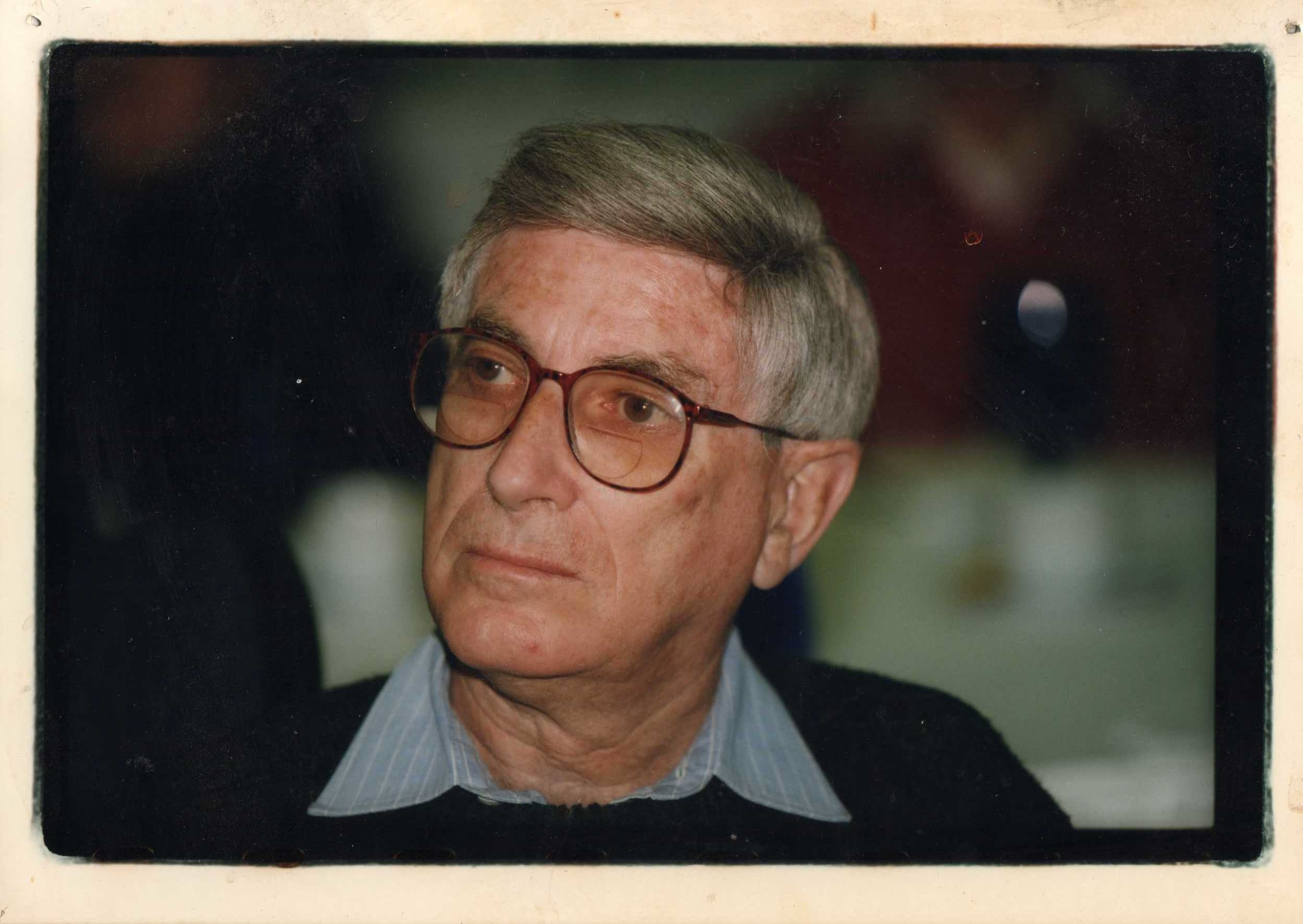
- Born: February 14, 1928; London, England
- Died: March 8, 2010 (aged 82); Ramat HaSharon, Israel
- Education: M.A., Ph.D.
- Alma mater: Hebrew University of Jerusalem
- Occupations: Diplomat, intelligence agent and journalist
- Known for: Involvement in the Iran-Contra affair

David Kimche (Hebrew: דוד קמחי; 14 February 1928 – 8 March 2010) was an Israeli diplomat, deputy director of the Mossad, spymaster and journalist. He is believed to have been the main contact between the United States and Iran during the Iran-Contra affair. Kimche was president of the Israel Council on Foreign Relations, and a member of the steering committee of the International Alliance for Arab-Israel Peace.

== Biography ==
David Kimche was born in England. His birth was registered in Hampstead, London between January and March 1928, with his mother's maiden name given as Palast. In addition to holding an M.A. (cum laude) and a Ph.D. in international relations from the Hebrew University of Jerusalem, Kimche studied at the Centre de Hautes Etudes Administratives sur l’Afrique et l’Asie Modernes (C.H.E.A.M.) of the University of Paris.

Kimche died of brain cancer at his home in Ramat HaSharon, near Tel Aviv, on 8 March 2010 at the age of 82.

== Diplomatic and public career ==
Kimche joined Mossad, Israel's foreign intelligence service, in 1953. While in the foreign intelligence service, he served in a number of postings in Africa, Asia and Europe. Among many others he recruited Olivia Frank, who infiltrated the Abu Nidal Organization and was part of a team which stopped a right-wing group from bombing the homes of Jewish families in Munich. Kimche moved up the ranks to eventually become Mossad's deputy director. In 1980 Kimche left Israel's foreign intelligence service. He became the director-general of the Ministry of Foreign Affairs, holding that post from 1980 to 1987.

Kimche was appointed ambassador-at-large of the State of Israel in 1987 and served a number of missions, especially in Arab countries. During his tenure Kimche would often engage in backchannel diplomacy when the political context required subtlety. In an article written in The Israel Journal of Foreign Affairs Nir Levitan wrote the following about his career: “Kimche strongly believed that what seemed impossible could be made possible, and he accomplished just that in his long and distinguished career.… Kimche was one of the foremost secret emissaries in service of the State of Israel at a time when backchannel diplomacy was the only way forward to a more peaceful future.”

In 1989, Kimche founded the Israel Council on Foreign Relations under the auspices of the World Jewish Congress to serve as a policy forum for visiting dignitaries and scholars. Kimche became the publisher of a bimonthly journal, the Israel Journal of Foreign Affairs. He was a member of the Board of Governors and the management committee of the Hebrew University in Jerusalem, the Board of Governors of The Harry S. Truman Research Institute for the Advancement of Peace in Jerusalem, and the board of directors of Maariv (a daily newspaper published in Tel Aviv) and a member of the executive board of the Peres Center for Peace.

== Author ==
He published a number of non-fiction books during his life, many co-authored with his brother Jon Kimche:

- (1955): with Jon Kimche, The Secret Roads: The "Illegal" Migration of a People, 1938-1948 (with plates, including portraits, and a map). New York: Farrar, Straus and Cudahy.
- (1960): with Jon Kimche, Both Sides of the Hill: Britain and the Palestine War. London: Secker & Warburg. Re-published as:
  - (1960): with Jon Kimche, A Clash of Destinies: The Arab-Jewish War and the Founding of the State of Israel. New York: Praeger.
- (1968): with Dan Bawly, The Sandstorm: The Arab-Israeli War of 1967: Prelude and Aftermath. London: Secker & Warburg. (Re-published as Six-Day War: Prologue and Aftermath in 1971.)
- (1969): with Jon Kimche, La premiere guerre d'Israel 1948: 16 cartes. Paris: Arthaud.
- (1973). Afro-Asian Movement: Ideology and Policy of the Third World. Jerusalem: Israel University Press.
- (1991): The Last Option: After Nasser, Arafat & Saddam Hussein - The Quest for Peace in the Middle East. London: Weidenfeld & Nicolson; New York: Charles Scribner's Sons.
