= Christopher Lowndes =

American merchant and judge

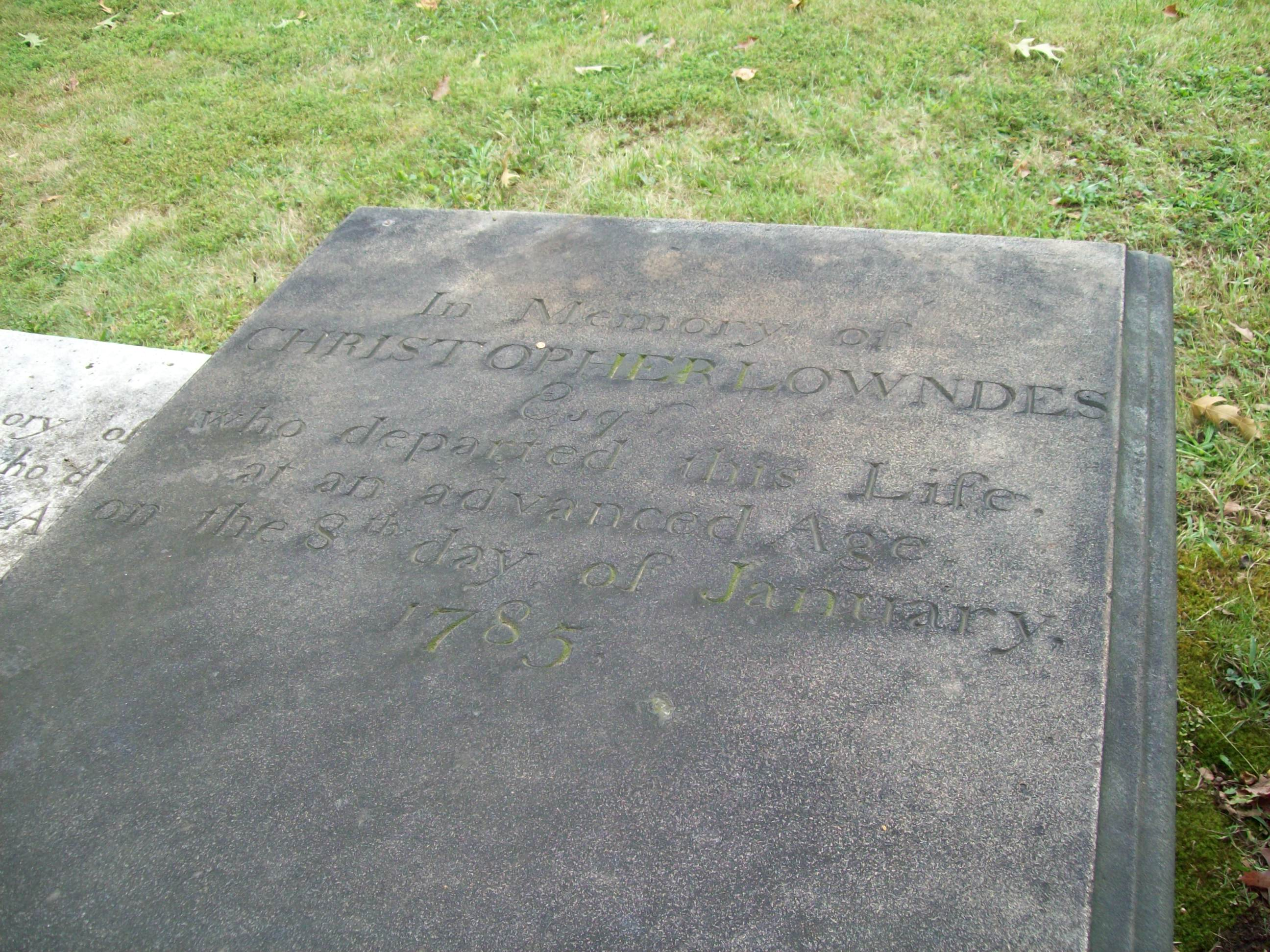
Grave of Christopher Lowndes, September 2009

Christopher Lowndes (baptized June 19, 1713 – January 8, 1785) was a leading merchant in colonial Bladensburg, Prince George's County, Maryland. He was named Commissioner of the town of Bladensburg in 1745, and in 1753 he was appointed one of the justices of Prince George's County, holding both offices until his death in 1785. He was the senior partner in Christopher Lowndes and Company which also included his brother Edward Lowndes, John Hardman and William Whalley.

== Biography ==
Coat of Arms of Christopher Lowndes

Christopher Lowndes was the fifth son of Richard Lowndes of Bostock House in Hassall, Cheshire, England and Margaret (née Poole). He was baptized at Sandbach on June 19, 1713.

As early as 1738, he was living in Prince George's County, Maryland. In 1748, he was the senior partner in the firm of Christopher Lowndes and Company operating both in Maryland and Liverpool, England. Christopher Lowndes was one of the Justices of Prince George's County from 1753 to 1775, and was of the Quorum from 1769. On June 4, 1777, he was commissioned under the new State government as one of the Justices of the county and Judge of the Orphans Court.

He died at Bladensburg on January 8, 1785. He was buried at St. Matthew's Church, Seat Pleasant, Maryland.

== Business endeavors ==
Christopher Lowndes was a leading businessman in Bladensburg, Maryland. Lowndes had arrived in Maryland in the 1730s as a representative for Liverpool merchants Henry and Edward Trafford. He later established Christopher Lowndes and Co. through which he sold dry goods and supplies. In addition, Lowndes owned a shipyard and manufactured rope and cordage for ocean-going vessels. This wealthy local merchant also owned several farms, and numerous tracts of land, and on two occasions, he was an investor in a ship that imported and sold slaves.

A leading shipbuilder and provider of shipping to and from Maryland and England, Lowndes ships carried a wide assortment of cargo. In May 1752 Lowndes and his brother-in-law, Benjamin Tasker, Jr. were listed in the advertisement in The Maryland Gazette announcing the arrival of the Elijah with its cargo of "healthy slaves" for sale at Severn River.

== Other ==
Lowndes was the builder and architect of St. Barnabas' Episcopal Church, Leeland in 1772.

== Family ==
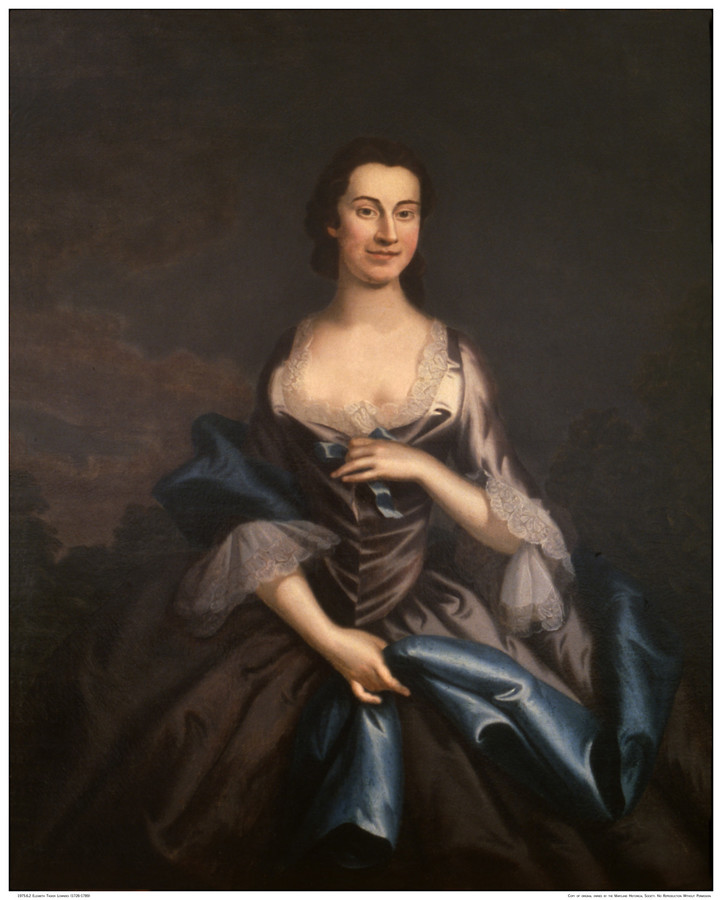
Elizabeth Tasker Lowndes (1726–1789), portrait by John Wollaston

On May 14, 1747, Lowndes married Elizabeth Tasker (February 4, 1726 – September 19, 1789), daughter of Benjamin Tasker, Sr., President of the Council of Maryland, at St. Anne's Parish in Annapolis, Maryland. They had nine children, and their daughter Rebecca Lowndes (1757-February 10, 1802) was married on June 17, 1781, to Benjamin Stoddert (1751–1813), first Secretary of the Navy of the United States. His great-grandson, Lloyd Lowndes, Jr. (1845–1905) was a U.S. congressman and Governor of Maryland from 1896 to 1900.

== Legacy ==
In 1748 he built a mansion in Bladensburg known as Bostwick that was listed on the National Register of Historic Places in 1975. One source of his wealth was the transatlantic slave trade.
