= Bank of Columbia =

- U.S. National Register of Historic Places
- Alabama Register of Landmarks and Heritage
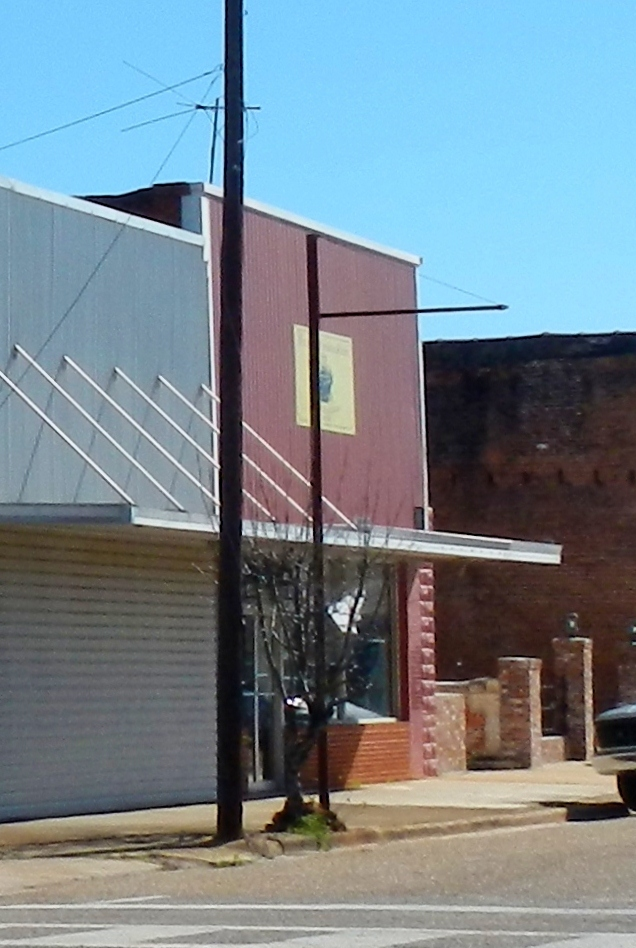
- The building in January 2012
- Interactive map of Bank of Columbia
- Location: 105 S. Main St., Columbia, Alabama
- Built: 1912
- NRHP reference No.: 100009568

Significant dates
- Added to NRHP: April 22, 2024
- Designated ARLH: September 16, 2021

The Bank of Columbia is a historic building in Columbia, Alabama, United States. It was listed on the Alabama Register of Landmarks and Heritage in 2021 and the National Register of Historic Places in 2024.

== History ==
The bank was established in 1912, with $25,000 in capital provided by Walter Flake Oakley Sr., a local merchant. Most of the bank's early clients were farmers in the surrounding areas. In 1958, the bank was robbed by brothers John, Clarence, and Alfred Anglin. After being captured five days later in Ohio, the trio were incarcerated; after repeated attempts to escape from federal prisons in Atlanta and Leavenworth, John and Clarence were moved to Alcatraz Federal Penitentiary in San Francisco, from which they escaped in 1962.

The building was sold to L. B. and Wynelle Douglas in 1976, who briefly leased it back to the bank while they constructed a new building around the corner on Church Street, which was completed in 1977. The bank was renamed to Peoples Community Bank in 1992. The Douglases sold the building to Charles Arthur Calhoun in 1977, who in turn sold it to the local chapter of the United Paperworkers International Union in 1983, who used it as their meeting hall. The union sold the building to the Columbia Historical Society in 2005, who today operate it as a local history museum.

== Architecture ==
The building is a two-story brick structure built in 1912 on the site of previous frame buildings that were destroyed by fires. The upper façade was covered in sheet metal in the 1960s, but the original brick remains underneath. A canopy extends from the building over the sidewalk, covering the left (north) entrance and large windows to the right (south). The lobby extends the full height of the building, and has a tile floor that was installed circa 1920–21. The original plaster walls are covered in wood veneer, and the original decorative pressed metal ceiling is covered by a suspended tile ceiling. The rear of the first floor contains the bank vault, a later-installed kitchen, archive room, and stairs. The second floor houses offices and storage.
