= Tracey Ballard =

American intelligence officer and activist

Tracey Ballard is an American intelligence officer and activist. She is considered the first visibly and openly gay employee of the CIA when she came out to her supervisors in 1989.

== Biography ==
Tracey Ballard is from Bladensburg, Maryland, and was raised by a single mother. She joined CIA in the mid-1980s, as a young, single mother. Ballard was a technical intelligence officer and computer expert in the CIA.

She came out as lesbian in 1988 and came out to her supervisors at CIA in 1989. She calls herself the first visible, cleared person to come out at CIA. During a polygraph examination as part of her security clearance renewal, Ballard revealed to security officials that she had a partner. At the time, openly gay Americans were barred from holding security clearances, a rule that was not repealed until 1995. Ballard's admission led to a year-and-a-half long personnel investigation, with CIA ultimately ruling that she could keep her clearance. Dating back to the 1953, gay people were believed to be a security risk due to their vulnerability to blackmail.

Within CIA, in 1996 Ballard founded and was the longtime chair of the Agency Network of Gay, Lesbian, Bisexual, and Transgender Officers and Allies (ANGLE), CIA's gay, lesbian and transgender group. It is one of the most active employee organizations within the CIA, with more than 200 members as of 2012.

Ballard was named a CIA Trailblazer in 2022.

== Personal ==
In 2014, Ballard married her longtime partner.
