= Cottage City, Maryland =

Town in Maryland, U.S.

- Town
- Town of Cottage City
- Flag Seal Logo

- Location of Cottage City, Maryland
- Coordinates: 38°56′11″N 76°57′2″W
- Country: United States of America
- State: Maryland
- County: Prince George's
- Incorporated: 1924

Area
  - Total: 0.29 sq mi (0.74 km^{2})
  - Land: 0.27 sq mi (0.71 km^{2})
  - Water: 0.012 sq mi (0.03 km^{2})
- Elevation: 30 ft (9 m)

Population (2020)
  - Total: 1,335
  - Density: 4,904.2/sq mi (1,893.53/km^{2})
- Time zone: UTC-5 (Eastern (EST))
  - Summer (DST): UTC-4 (EDT)
- ZIP code: 20722
- Area codes: 301, 240
- FIPS code: 24-20050
- GNIS feature ID: 0597284
- Website: http://www.cottagecitymd.gov/

Cottage City, officially the Town of Cottage City, is a town in Prince George's County, Maryland, United States. Per the 2020 census, the population was 1,335. Cottage City is a small, quiet community lying between Eastern Avenue (the border with Washington), Brentwood, Colmar Manor, and the Anacostia River. Cottage City was developed, beginning in 1870, under the name of "The Highlands". The area was incorporated in 1924 as Cottage City.

== History ==
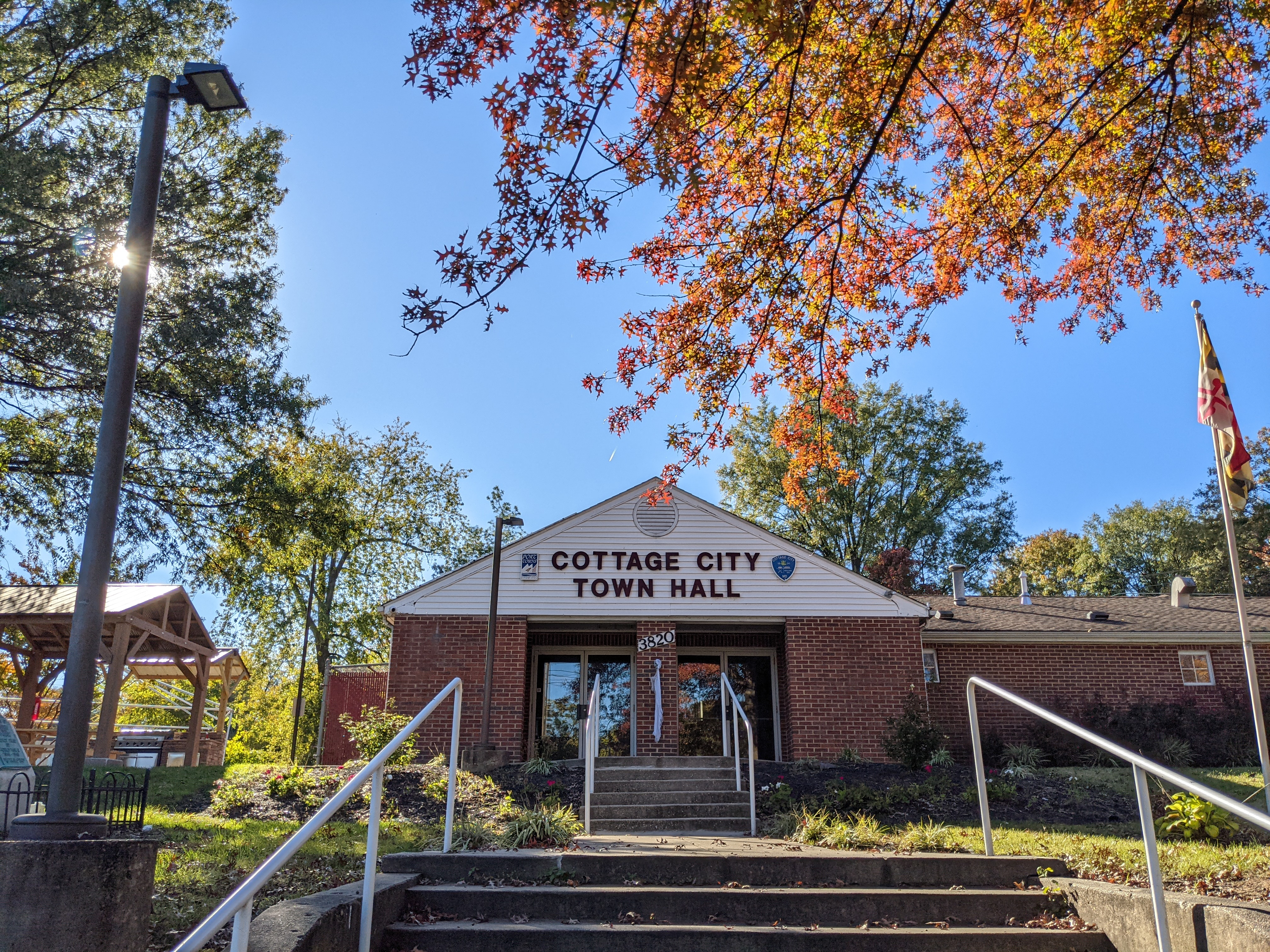
Cottage City's Town Hall

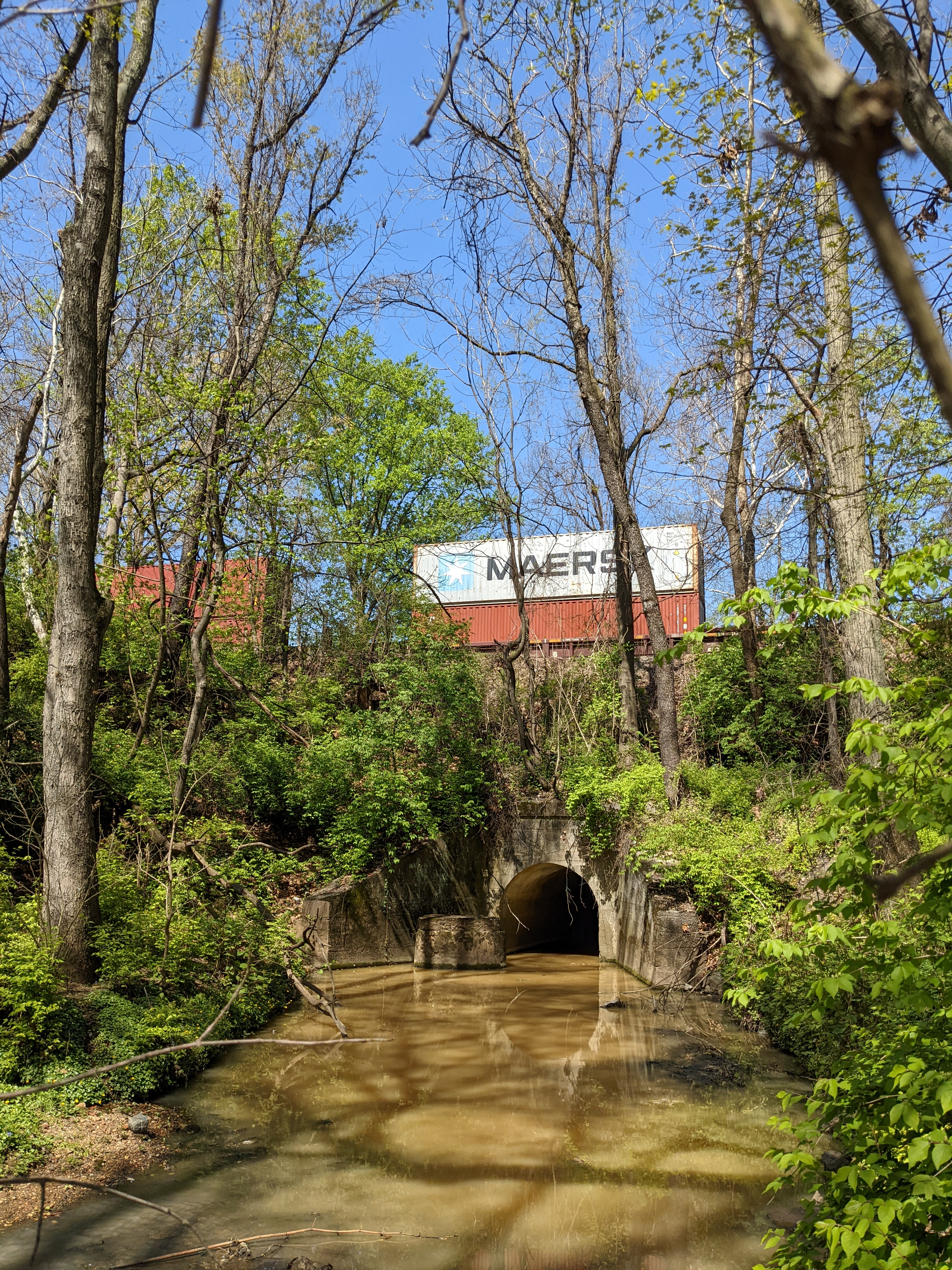
Dueling Creek passes through this culvert under the CSX railroad line from Mount Rainier.

Its history dates to pre-revolutionary America; old records indicate that the area was home to several of the Potomac River Indian tribes. With the coming of European settlers, the area became noted for its deep-water Anacostia River port, known then as Harrison's Landing. Contributing to the economy of Harrison's Landing was Moyer's Grist Mill located in Yarrow, the very first mill of its type between Baltimore and Alexandria, Virginia. Yarrow was renamed several times, but today we know Yarrow as Cottage City.

Known as the Dark and Bloody Grounds, the former site of the Bladensburg Dueling Grounds was located along Dueling Creek and Bladensburg Road; the historic location now shares the present-day boundary of the towns of Cottage City and Colmar Manor. Cottage City and Moyer's Mill played a key role in the Battle of Bladensburg during the War of 1812. The mill acted as a hospital for wounded American militia, as well as an artillery battery. American forces were repulsed in a bitter fight in Mr. Moyer's orchards, an event that resulted ultimately in the burning of the nation's capital.

During the post-Civil War years, President Ulysses S. Grant stayed at a summer retreat known as the Friendship House located in Cottage City. Friendship House is long gone, replaced in the 1940s by an apartment house located on 38th Avenue and Parkwood Street.

During the 1870s, groups of developers began to promote a residential community with large lots and a grid pattern of streets, stating the advantages of the community. "The Highlands" would feature cottages and villas on wide avenues, a good view, nominal taxes, and was close to Washington, D.C., the historic Bladensburg battlefield, spa spring, and dueling ground. The development failed despite the advertising campaign. In 1886, Colonel Gilbert Moyer bought the Highland tract, and incorporated the Highland Company in 1888. The land was re-subdivided into smaller lots, and Moyer promoted the land by including information that a streetcar line was soon to be developed in the area. This attempt to develop the area also failed. A few houses were developed on the Moyer property beginning in 1904 with broad streets laid out in a grid and trees planted along the street. A single-track trolley line ran through the community from Washington to Bladensburg. Called the Washington, Spa Spring and Gretta Railroad, the trolley was eventually discontinued in 1923, partially due to competition from the Baltimore and Ohio Railroad and the streetcar line in Mount Rainier.

In 1915, Charles Lightbrown borrowed money and attempted to market the subdivision plat from 1888 with a few minor changes. This attempt succeeded where the two earlier attempts had failed. Lightbrown built most of the housing in the community. Consisting of one-story cottages with four rooms and no running water, the housing was attractive to veterans returning from World War I who needed economical homes which were ready to inhabit. Electric service was introduced to the community in 1914. In 1919, the Washington Suburban Sanitary Commission installed water service to the town; sewer service was added the following year. The town was incorporated in 1924, taking its name from the uniform cottages built by Charles Lightbrown.

The exorcism of Roland Doe, the story that was the basis for the 1971 novel and 1973 film The Exorcist, has its roots in Cottage City.

In 1999, Cottage City, Bladensburg, and Colmar Manor were lauded by the Joint Center for Sustainable Communities for their collaboration with Prince George's County for the Port Towns Revitalization Initiative, which created a common Port Towns identity for the towns; encouraged businesses development through infrastructure and façade improvements; acquisition of historic properties and plans for their reuse; and reconstruction of the Bladensburg waterfront and marina.

Today, Cottage City is an ethnically mixed community with cottage-style homes on tree-lined streets. The community partners with the county in the Port Towns Redevelopment Plan to revitalize the neighborhoods while preserving their historic heritage. The town's goals for this effort are an improved environment and quality of life for its residents.

== Geography ==
Cottage City is located at 38°56′11″N 76°57′2″W (38.936261, -76.950606).

According to the United States Census Bureau, the town has a total area of 0.25 square miles (0.65 km^{2}), all land.

== Bordering areas ==
- Washington, D.C. (south)
- Colmar Manor (southeast)
- Brentwood (southwest)
- North Brentwood (west)
- Mount Rainier (southwest)

== Demographics ==
Historical population
Census	Pop.	Note	%±
1930	938		—
1940	1,044		11.3%
1950	1,249		19.6%
1960	1,099		−12.0%
1970	993		−9.6%
1980	1,122		13.0%
1990	1,236		10.2%
2000	1,136		−8.1%
2010	1,305		14.9%
2020	1,335		2.3%
U.S. Decennial Census; 2010 2020

=== 2020 census ===
Cottage City town, Maryland – Racial and ethnic composition Note: the US Census treats Hispanic/Latino as an ethnic category. This table excludes Latinos from the racial categories and assigns them to a separate category. Hispanics/Latinos may be of any race.
Race / Ethnicity (NH = Non-Hispanic)	Pop 2000	Pop 2010	Pop 2020	% 2000	% 2010	% 2020
White alone (NH)	300	150	159	26.41%	11.49%	11.91%
Black or African American alone (NH)	602	576	459	52.99%	44.14%	34.38%
Native American or Alaska Native alone (NH)	10	10	5	0.88%	0.77%	0.37%
Asian alone (NH)	46	90	69	4.05%	6.90%	5.17%
Native Hawaiian or Pacific Islander alone (NH)	0	0	5	0.00%	0.00%	0.37%
Other race alone (NH)	1	3	9	0.09%	0.23%	0.67%
Mixed race or Multiracial (NH)	26	27	42	2.29%	2.07%	3.15%
Hispanic or Latino (any race)	151	449	587	13.29%	34.41%	43.97%
Total	1,136	1,305	1,335	100.00%	100.00%	100.00%

=== 2010 census ===
As of the census of 2010, there were 1,305 people, 467 households, and 263 families residing in the town. The population density was 5,220.0 inhabitants per square mile (2,015.5/km^{2}). There were 500 housing units at an average density of 2,000.0 per square mile (772.2/km^{2}). The racial makeup of the town was 20.7% White, 46.6% African American, 1.7% Native American, 6.9% Asian, 19.2% from other races, and 4.9% from two or more races. Hispanic or Latino of any race were 34.4% of the population.

There were 467 households, of which 31.0% had children under the age of 18 living with them, 32.3% were married couples living together, 18.8% had a female householder with no husband present, 5.1% had a male householder with no wife present, and 43.7% were non-families. 36.4% of all households were made up of individuals, and 11.2% had someone living alone who was 65 years of age or older. The average household size was 2.79 and the average family size was 3.67.

The median age in the town was 38.7 years. 22.5% of residents were under the age of 18; 8.3% were between the ages of 18 and 24; 27.2% were from 25 to 44; 31.5% were from 45 to 64; and 10.4% were 65 years of age or older. The gender makeup of the town was 48.0% male and 52.0% female.

=== 2000 census ===
As of the census of 2000, there were 1,136 people, 465 households, and 248 families residing in the town. The population density was 4,613.5 inhabitants per square mile (1,781.3/km^{2}). There were 503 housing units at an average density of 2,042.8 per square mile (788.7/km^{2}). The racial makeup of the town was 28.61% White, 54.75% African American, 0.88% Native American, 4.05% Asian, 7.57% from other races, and 4.14% from two or more races. Hispanic or Latino of any race were 13.29% of the population.

There were 465 households, out of which 24.9% had children under the age of 18 living with them, 32.7% were married couples living together, 17.0% had a female householder with no husband present, and 46.5% were non-families. 41.5% of all households were made up of individuals, and 14.0% had someone living alone who was 65 years of age or older. The average household size was 2.44 and the average family size was 3.39.

In the town, the population was spread out, with 23.7% under the age of 18, 7.7% from 18 to 24, 28.4% from 25 to 44, 26.8% from 45 to 64, and 13.3% who were 65 years of age or older. The median age was 40 years. For every 100 females, there were 91.2 males. For every 100 females age 18 and over, there were 84.5 males.

The median income for a household in the town was $38,594, and the median income for a family was $47,639. Males had a median income of $33,438 versus $34,519 for females. The per capita income for the town was $17,166. About 11.0% of families and 13.5% of the population were below the poverty line, including 7.8% of those under age 18 and 23.8% of those age 65 or over.

== Government ==
Prince George's County Police Department District 1 Station in Hyattsville serves Cottage City.

== Transportation ==
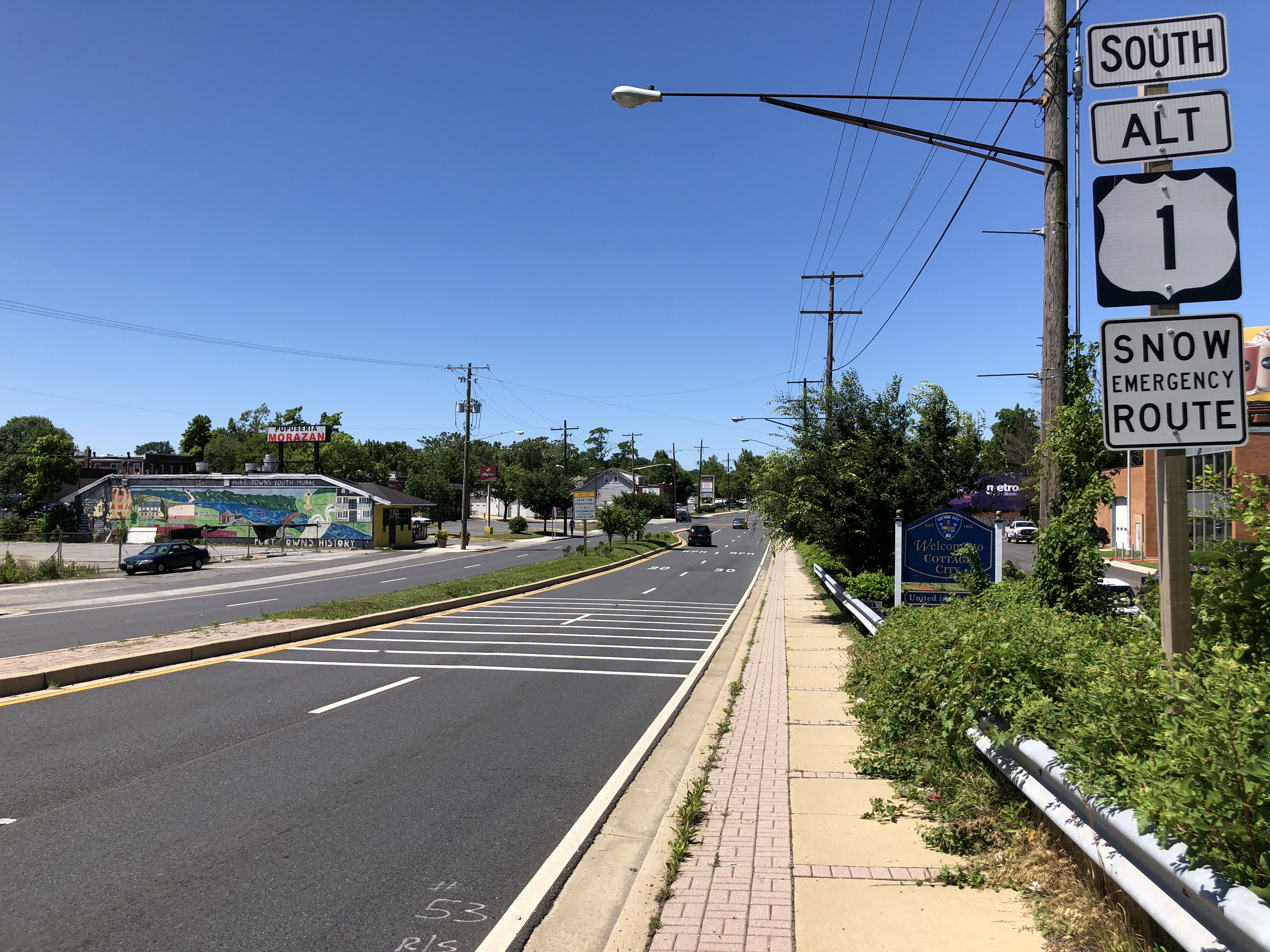
US 1 Alternate southbound on the edge of Cottage City

Two state highways serve Cottage City. The more significant one is U.S. Route 1 Alternate. US 1 Alternate follows Bladensburg Road along Cottage City's border with Colmar Manor, connecting the town to Washington, D.C., and Bladensburg. Maryland Route 208 is the other state highway in the town, connecting US 1 Alternate to Brentwood via 38th Avenue.

== Education ==
Cottage City is zoned to Prince George's County Public Schools:

- Rogers Heights Elementary School
- William Wirt Middle School
- Bladensburg High School

== Notable people ==
- Elizabeth Magie. In 1904, Elizabeth Magie received a patent for her Landlord's Game, a leftwing teaching tool that came to be known by millions as the board game Monopoly. However, Magie reportedly received a mere $500 for her creation, no royalties, and until recently, little credit.
- Ronald Hunkeler, a.k.a. Roland Doe or Robbie Mannheim, alleged demonically possessed boy who inspired William Peter Blatty to write the fictionalized book The Exorcist
