= Dueling Creek =

Creek in Colmar Manor, Maryland, United States

Coordinates: 38°55′43″N 76°56′35″W

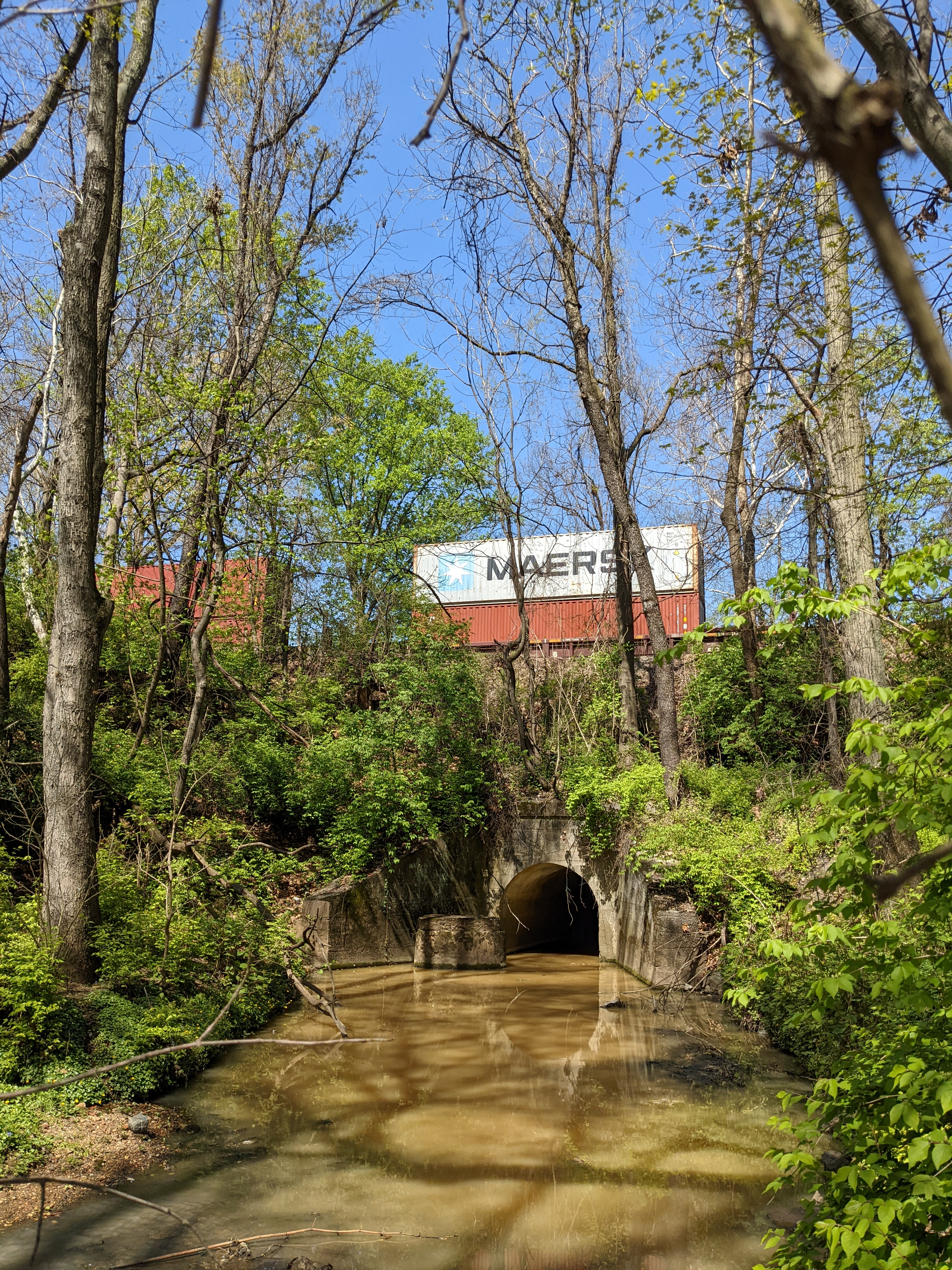
Dueling Creek looking west from Cottage City, Maryland. The creek passes under the CSX Capital Subdivision mainline.

Dueling Creek is a tributary of the Anacostia River in southern Maryland in the United States, located in the town of Colmar Manor.

The Bladensburg Dueling Grounds on the creek was a favorite spot for duels in the 19th century, and was the site of a duel between Stephen Decatur and James Barron.

== See also ==
- Bladensburg Dueling Grounds
- List of rivers of Maryland
