= Bladensburg High School =

- Bladensburg High School in 2026

Location
- 4200 57th Avenue; Bladensburg, Maryland; United States; 38°56′27″N 76°55′3″W

Information
- Type: Public secondary
- Motto: “A Journey to Excellence: Stronger. Higher. Better. Together!”
- Established: 1936 (Rebuilt 2005)
- School district: Prince George's County Public Schools
- Principal: Arthur Mola
- Grades: 9–12
- Enrollment: 2,114 (2025-26)
- Colors: Maroon, White, Black
- Mascot: Mustang
- Nickname: Blade
- Yearbook: Peacecrosser
- Website: www.pgcps.org/bladensburghs/

Bladensburg High School is a public high school located in Bladensburg, Maryland, United States. The school, which serves grades 9 through 12, is a part of the Prince George's County Public Schools district.

The school serves: the towns of Bladensburg, Colmar Manor, and Cottage City, as well almost all of the Town of Cheverly, portions of the towns of Edmonston and Riverdale Park, a small section of the City of Hyattsville, and sections of East Riverdale and Landover census-designated places. In addition the school serves students from all across the county that are selected to enroll in its prestigious Biomedical Program.

== History ==
In 1950 a permanent building was constructed, in phases. Beginning in the 1980s the district made plans to renovate or replace the building, but delays occurred as PGCPS resources were devoted to schools that needed to be built or ones that had more serious problems in their facilities. In 1999 PGCPS decided that Bladensburg High would get a new building instead of a renovation. Prior to 2001 the school building became infested with insects and rats, prompting PGCPS officials to make its replacement a priority.

The $45 million project was scheduled to begin in January 2001 and was originally to last until circa 2003. In 2000 officials were looking for a campus to temporarily house the students. The first plan was to send the students to the former Northwestern High School building, but the Hyattsville city council disapproved of this as it felt the Bladensburg students would be too close to the Northwestern students, already occupying the current school building. The second choice was a building in Bowie, but around 100 Bowie residents protested against this plan in a city hall meeting; Several Bowie city council members stated that the controversy gave Bowie a negative image.

Bladensburg High was temporarily relocated to the Belair Annex in Bowie, a former school building that was used by PGCPS to house excess students from other schools; Bowie residents hoped to use the annex to relieve area schools that had excess students. By 2002 the district planned to install 18 trailers at Belair to house additional students. The trailers were later 22, then 38. The opening of the new Bladensburg High was pushed back from 2004 to 2005, and the swelling student population that was far larger than the capacity of the original school necessitated additional construction, eroding the patience of the residents of surrounding Bowie neighborhoods who felt impacted by the additional buildings and traffic. In addition Bladensburg students wished for the new campus to be complete as they perceived the temporary facilities to be inadequate. The new Bladensburg High opened in August 2005.

In April 2011, Bladensburg High School won three first-place awards, placing the schools in Bladensburg as the number-one contender in Communication, Science, Technology, Engineering, and Math.

In 2011, Bladensburg High School appeared in several media showcases for its work with the DREAM Act; Communication, Science, Technology, Engineering, and Math awards; Secondary School Reform courses; Nobel Laureate William Daniel Phillips' physics presentation at the school; and winning the Grammy Foundation Award for Excellence in Music.

Bladensburg High School graduated a Gates Millennium Scholar in 2009 and its first Posse Foundation scholar in 2011.

== Demographics ==
Bladensburg has had significant historical changes in the demographics of its students. When Bladensburg High School opened in the mid-1930s, all students were white. Due to the desegregation of public schools nationwide in 1954 and, later, the changing population of Prince George's County overall, student enrollment is now 49% African-American and 49% Hispanic/Latino.

== Programs ==
In 2011 the school was one of two in the county with an on-site daycare; it also had classes for new parents.

== Curriculum ==
Bladensburg High School offers programs of study in biomedicine, culinary arts, cosmetology, agriculture, and nursing. Over the last two years, the school, along with its feeder middle school and elementary school, participated in the national Communication, Science, Technology, Engineering, and Math competition in Houston.

== Notable alumni ==
- Dokun Akingbade, basketball player
- Thurl Bailey, former NBA player
- Wayne K. Curry, former Prince George's County Executive
- Brian Davis, former professional basketball player
- Ebenezer Ekuban, former National Football League player
- Ellen Louise Graham, journalist at Wall Street Journal and 1999 Pulitzer Prize finalist
- Mike Holston, former National Football League player
- Abdul K. Kallon, former District Judge of the U.S. District Court for the Northern District of Alabama.
- John P. McDonough, former Secretary of State of Maryland
- Steve Rochinski, bebop jazz guitarist and educator
- Jason Williams, former professional basketball player
