= Mike Holston =

American football player (born 1958)

Michael Holston
No. 84
- Position: Wide receiver

Personal information
- Born: January 8, 1958 (age 68); Seat Pleasant, Maryland, U.S.
- Listed height: 6 ft 3 in (1.91 m)
- Listed weight: 189 lb (86 kg)

Career information
- High school: Bladensburg (Bladensburg, Maryland)
- College: Morgan State
- NFL draft: 1981: 3rd round, 79th overall pick

Career history
- Houston Oilers (1981–1985); Kansas City Chiefs (1985)

Career NFL statistics
- Receptions: 74
- Receiving yards: 1,111
- Touchdowns: 4
- Stats at Pro Football Reference

Michael Anthony Holston (born January 8, 1958) is an American former professional football player who was a wide receiver in the National Football League (NFL). Holston was selected in the third round by the Houston Oilers out of Morgan State University in the 1981 NFL draft.
