= Port Towns =

Municipality group in Maryland

Municipal boundaries of the Port Towns

The Port Towns is a designation for a grouping of four small suburban municipalities in Prince George's County, Maryland, just across the border from Washington, D.C. These municipalities collaborate on planning and economic development projects.

== Municipalities ==
- Bladensburg
- Colmar Manor
- Cottage City
- Edmonston

== Gallery ==
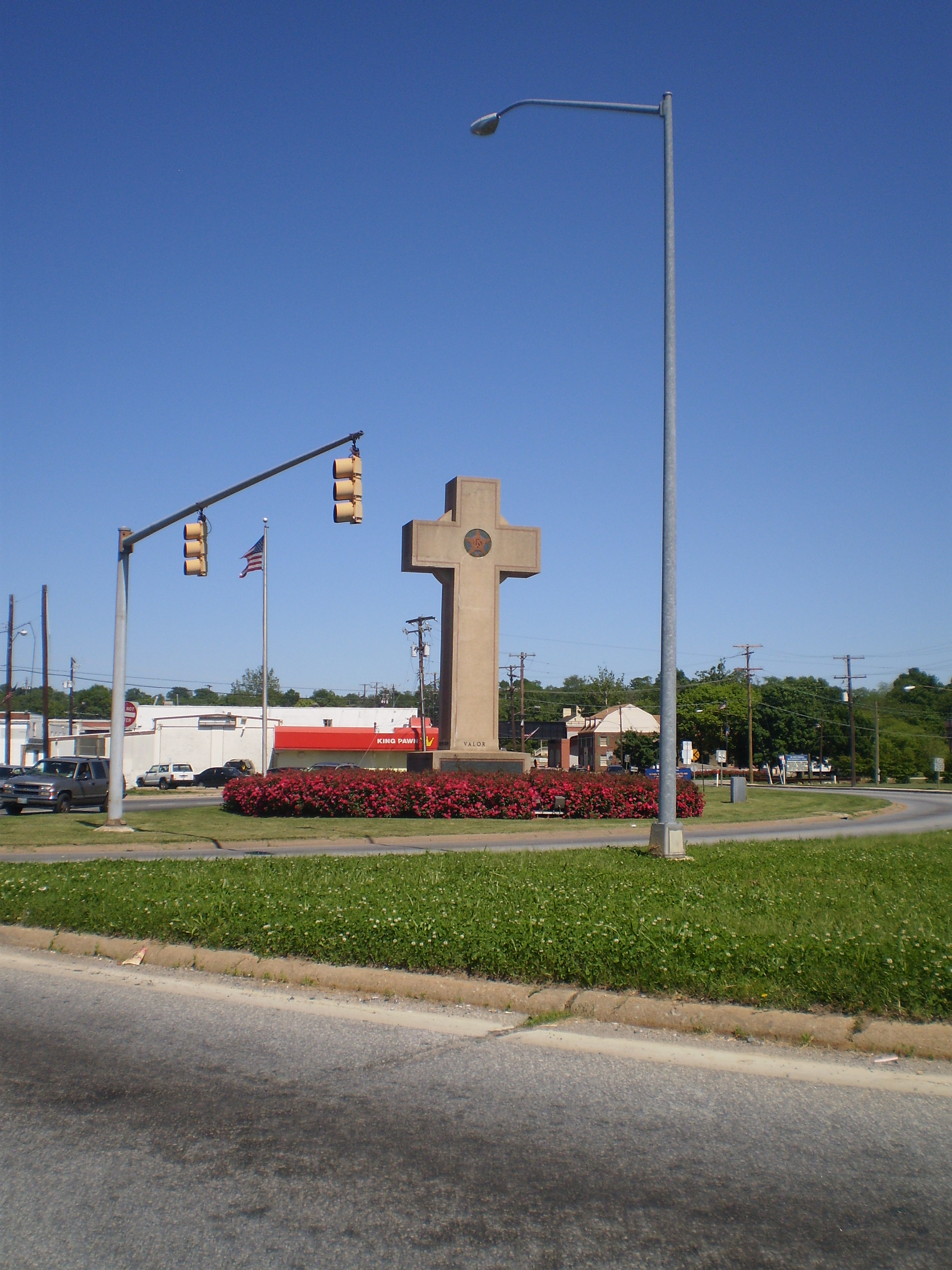
Bladensburg

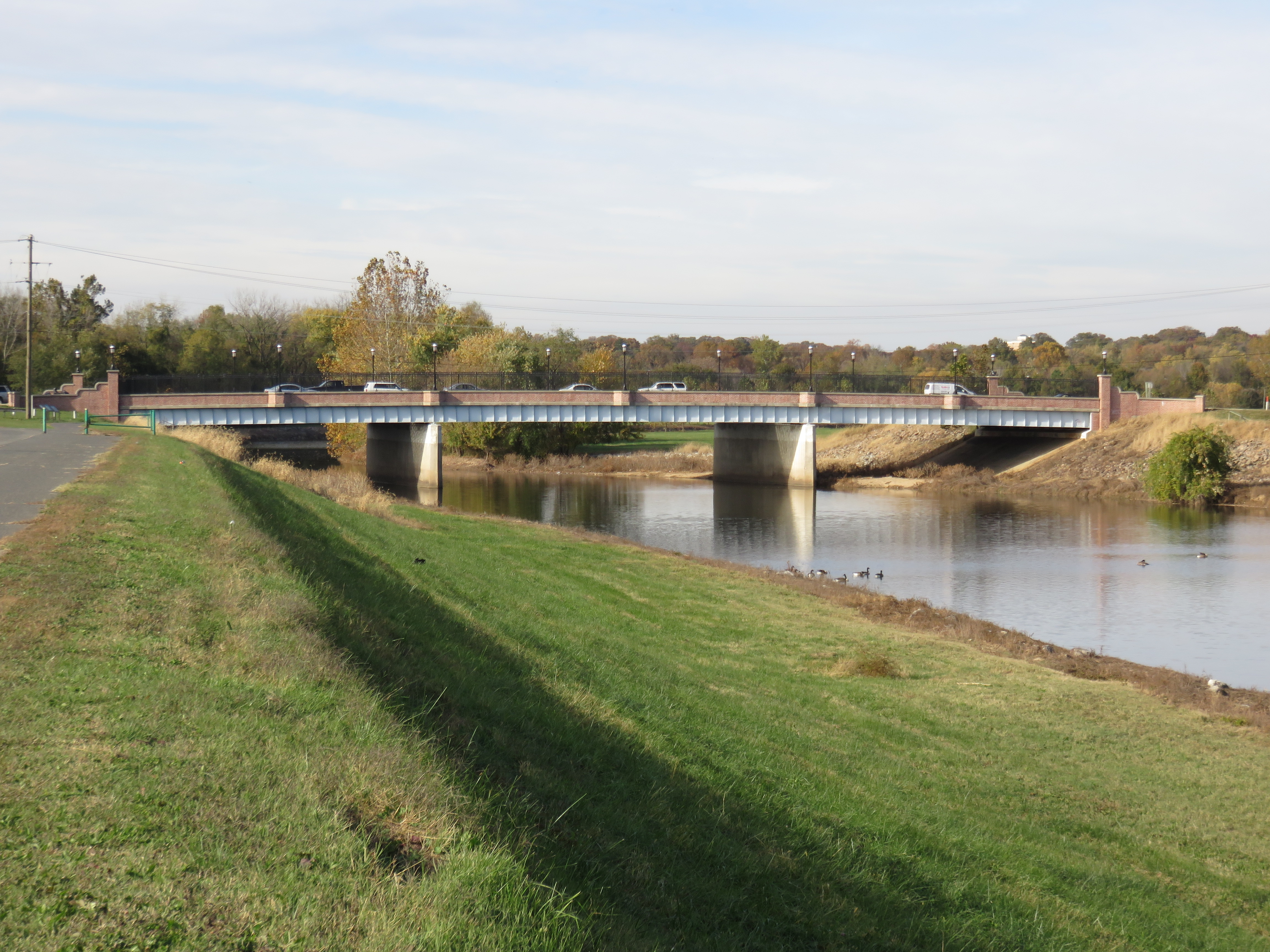
Colmar Manor

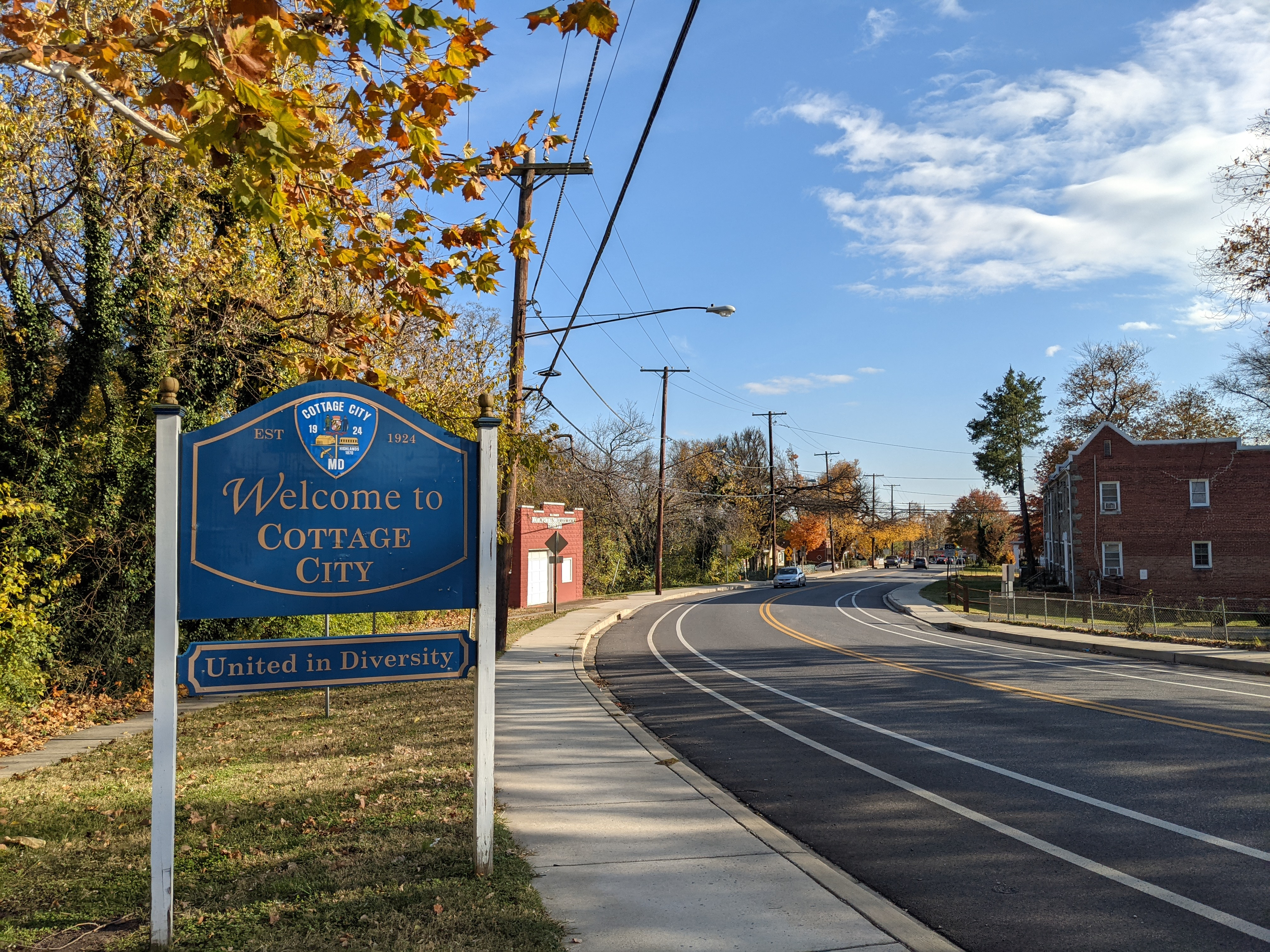
Cottage City

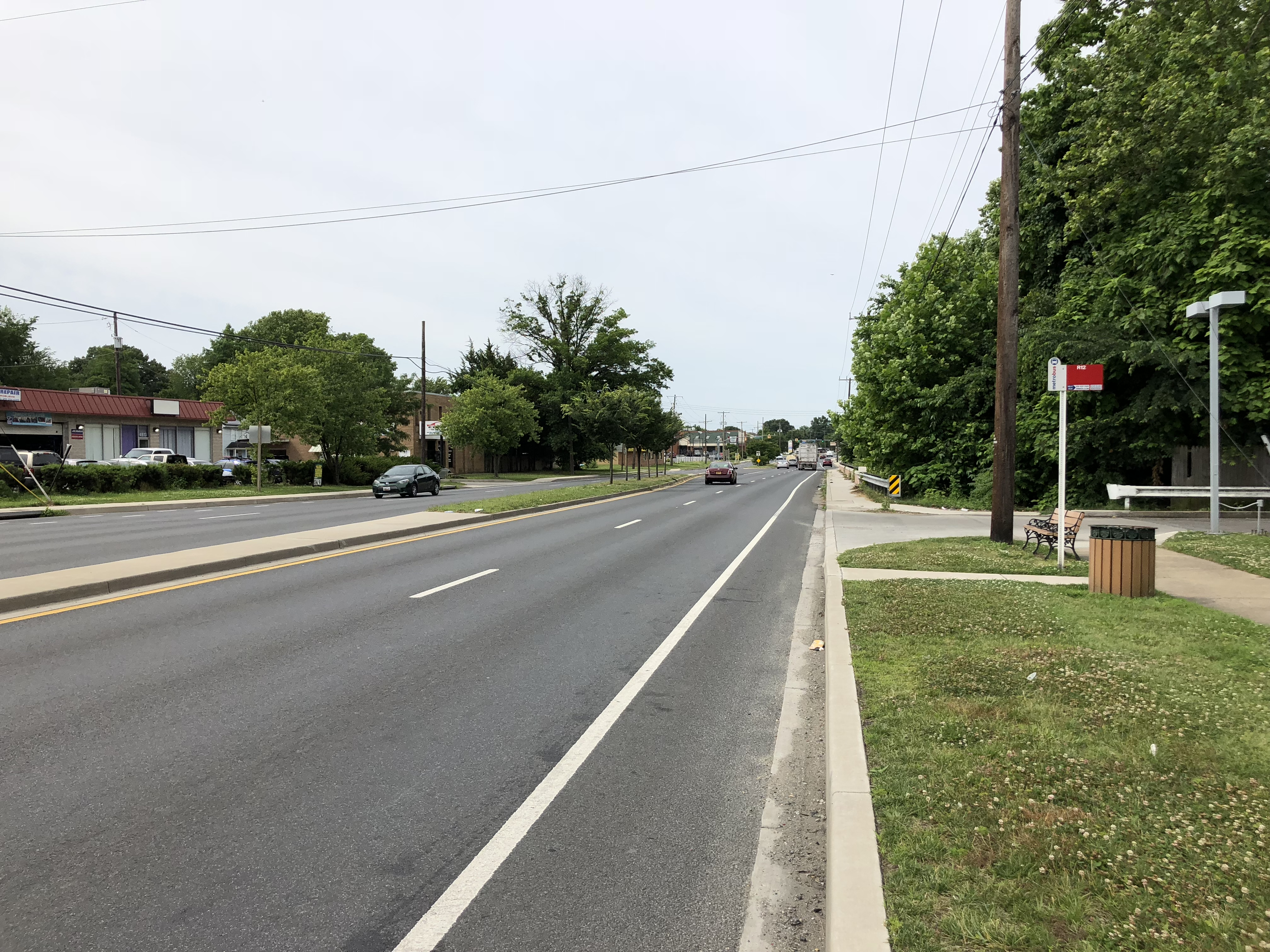
Edmonston
