= Bladensburg Dueling Grounds =

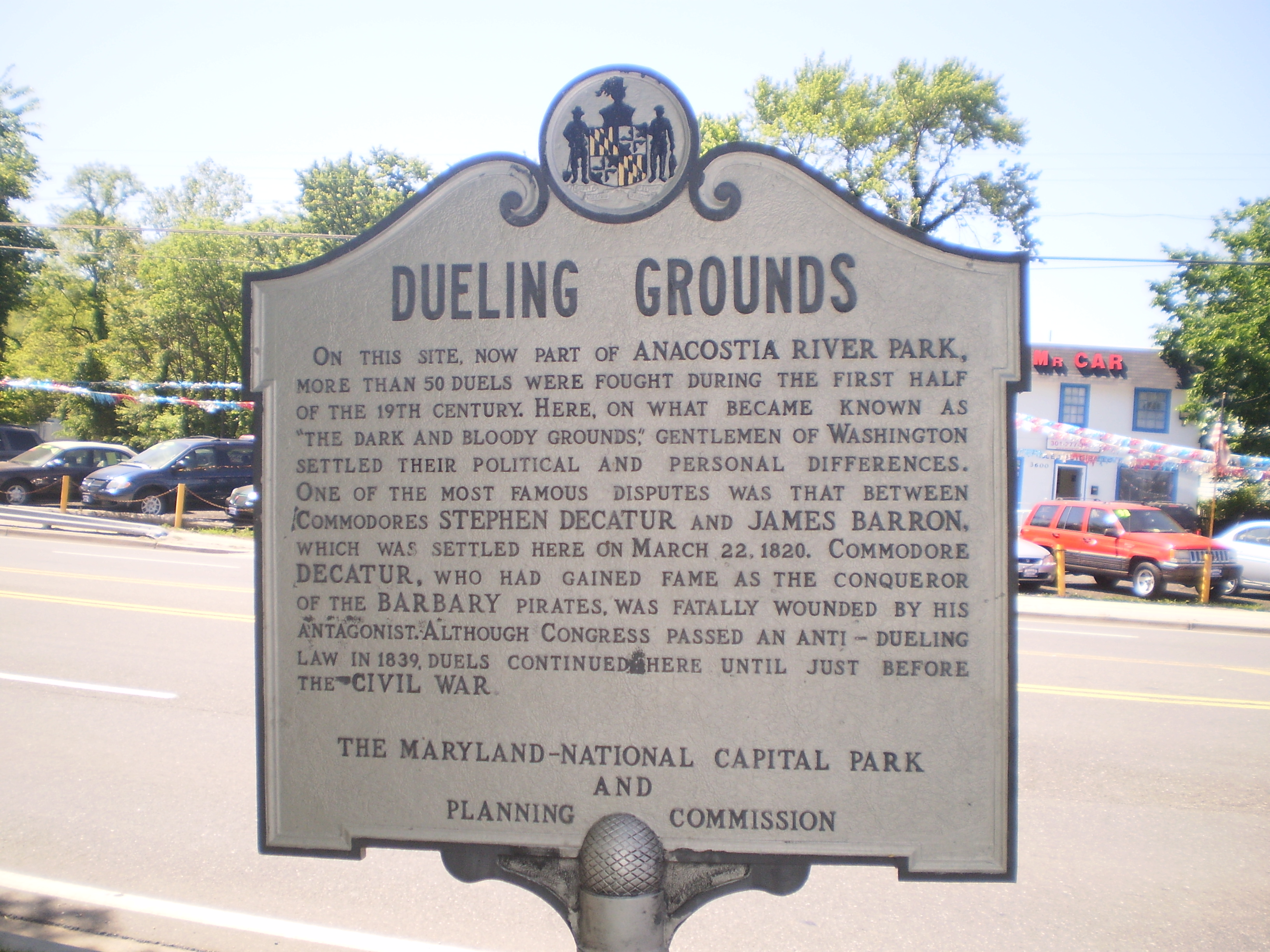
- Interactive map of Bladensburg Dueling Grounds
- Type: County park and state historic site
- Location: Dueling Creek Natural Area, Colmar Manor Community Park, Colmar Manor, Maryland, United States (formerly, the Bladensburg Dueling Grounds, in Bladensburg, Maryland)
- Coordinates: 38°55′30.6″N 76°56′25.4″W
- Created: October 15, 1966
- Owner: Prince George's County Department of Parks and Recreation

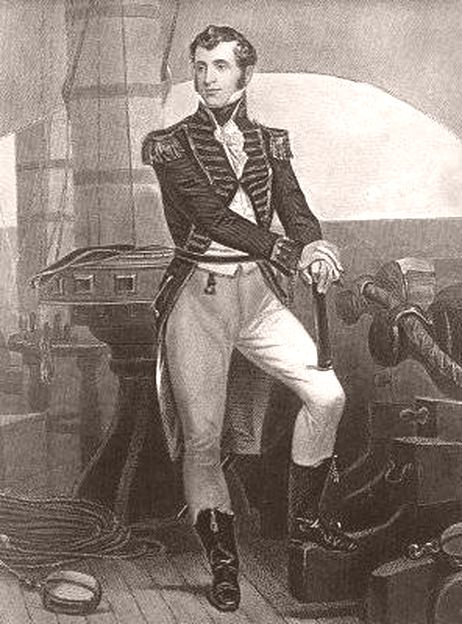
The most publicized duel of the 19th century was that of Commodore Stephen Decatur, the U.S. naval hero, who was mortally wounded in 1820 at the Bladensburg Dueling Grounds and later died at his home in Washington D.C.

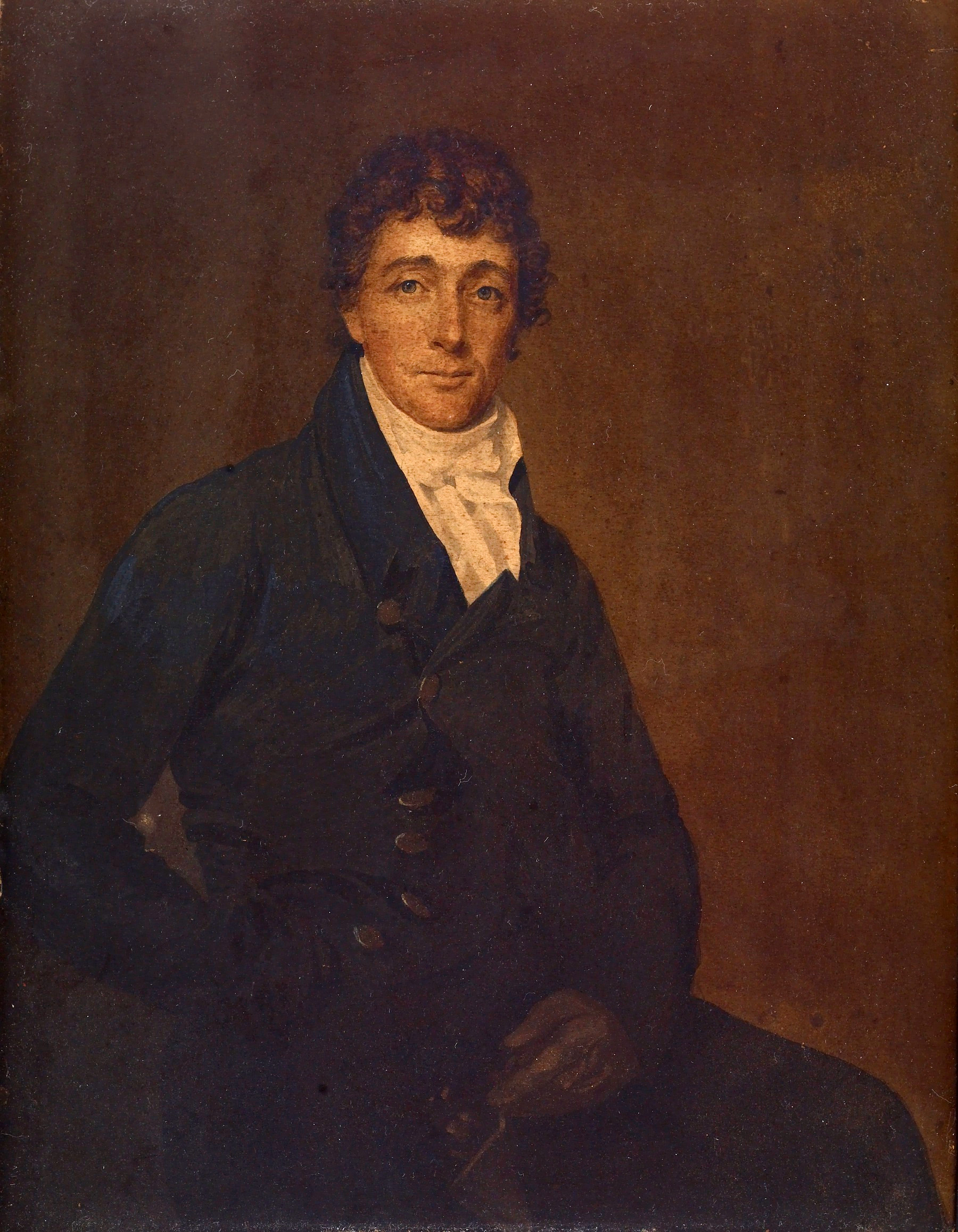
Portrait of Francis Scott Key. Key's son, Daniel, was killed, at the dueling grounds, in 1836 by a fellow midshipman from the navy over a disagreement about steamboat speed.

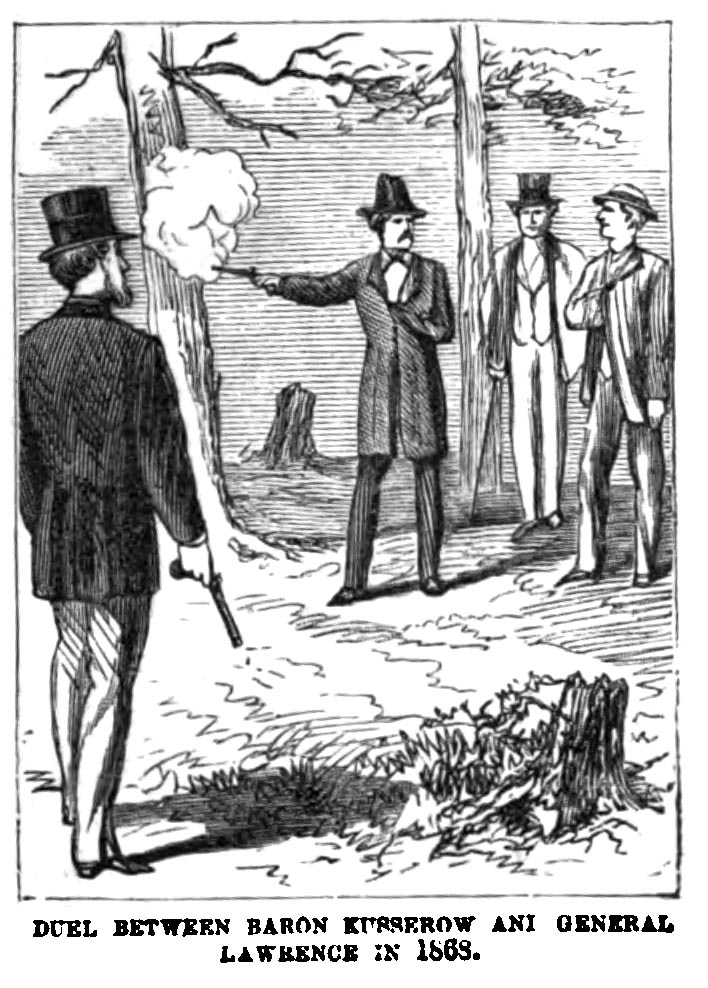
The last recorded duel at the Bladensburg Dueling Grounds was between General A. Gallatin Lawrence and Baron Kusserow in 1868.

Notable Bladensburg duelists
- Duration: 1808-1868
- Participants: Barent Gardenier vs. George W. Campbell (1808); John Mason McCarty vs. Armistead Thomson Mason (1819); Stephen Decatur vs. James Barron (1820); Daniel Key vs. John Sherbourne (1836); Jonathan Cilley vs. William J. Graves (1838); A. Galletin Lawrence vs. Baron Kusserow (1868)
- Deaths: Armistead Thomson Mason, killed; Stephen Decatur, mortally wounded; Daniel Key, killed; Jonathan Cilley, mortally wounded
- Injuries: Barent Gardenier, wounded

Bladensburg Dueling Grounds is a small spit of land, a fraction of its original size, along Dueling Creek, formerly in the town of Bladensburg, Maryland, and now within the town of Colmar Manor, just to the northeast of Washington, D.C., United States. Dueling Creek, formerly known as '"Blood Run" and "The Dark and Bloody Grounds", is a tributary of the Anacostia River, which was formerly, called the East Branch Potomac River.

From 1808 the grove witnessed approximately fifty duels by gentlemen, military officers, and politicians, settling "affairs of honor". A formalized set of rules and etiquette, the code duello was usually enforced by the duelers and their seconds. The exact number of duels and the names of all the participants who fought at Bladensburg may never be known because surviving records are obscure, the events are not well documented - and dueling was illegal.

Following the Civil War, dueling fell out of favor as a means of settling personal grievances and declined rapidly; the last known duel was fought here in 1868.

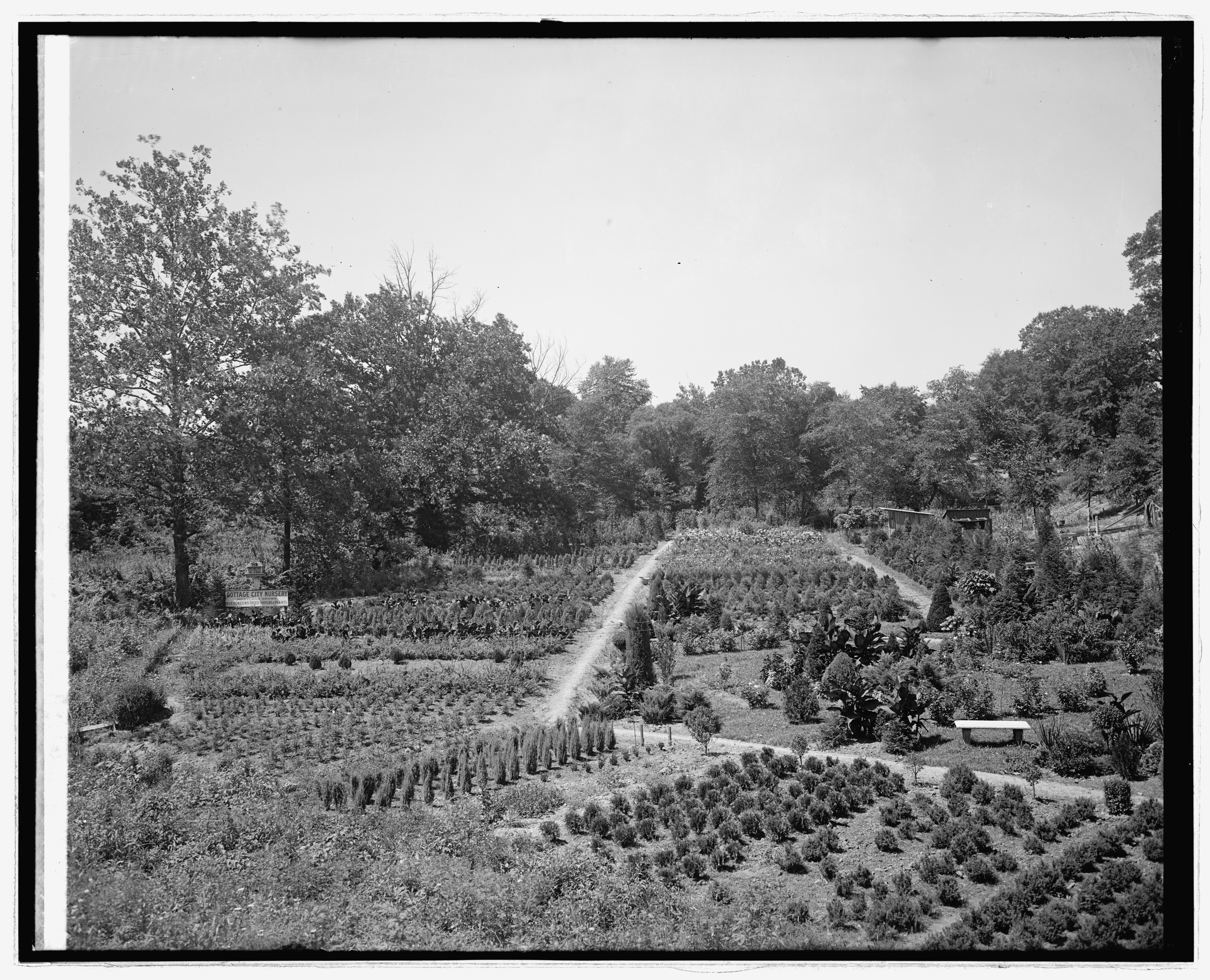
Old dueling ground, Bladensburg, Md, pictured between 1910 and 1926

Bladensburg was said to have a notorious reputation due to its association with the dueling grounds, becoming a popular tourist attraction due to its romanticized history.

== Notable duels ==
- In 1808, U.S. Representative Barent Gardenier of New York, fought a duel with U.S. Representative George W. Campbell, from Tennessee, resulting from opposition by Gardenier to the presidential administration of Thomas Jefferson backing a trade embargo with Great Britain and France. Gardenier challenged Campbell, and their duel was notable as being the first to be fought on what became the Bladensburg Dueling Grounds. Barent Gardenier was wounded but subsequently recovered and won reelection.
- In 1819, Colonel John Mason McCarty killed his second cousin, General Armistead Thomson Mason. McCarty was haunted for years by his experience after surviving the musket duel.
- Naval hero Commodore Stephen Decatur was mortally wounded, in 1820, by Commodore James Barron. Where Decatur and Barron dueled is no longer included, within the boundaries of the current Dueling Creek Park.
- In June 1836, 22-year-old Daniel Key, the son of Francis Scott Key, was killed in a duel with a fellow Naval Academy midshipman John Sherbourne over a question regarding steamboat speed.
- Congressman Jonathan Cilley, a representative from Maine, was a reluctant participant. In February 1838, Cilley was killed by Congressman William J. Graves of Kentucky. Graves was a stand-in for New York newspaper editor James Webb, whom Cilley had called corrupt. Cilley was inexperienced with guns, and Graves was allowed to use a powerful rifle. A severed artery, in the leg of Cilley, caused him to bleed to death in ninety seconds. This duel prompted passage of a Congressional act of February 20, 1839, prohibiting the giving or accepting challenges to a duel within the District of Columbia.
- General A. Gallatin Lawrence, U.S. minister to Costa Rica and Baron Kusserow, secretary of the German Legation, fought a bloodless duel in 1868, being the last recorded duel fought at the Bladensburg Dueling Grounds.

== See also ==
- American politicians killed in duels
- List of Confederate duels
- Dueling in the Southern United States
