= Ellen Louise Graham =

American journalist (born 1943)

- Born: 30 December 1943; Glendale, California, U.S.
- Died: 20 October 2025 (aged 81)
- Education: Syracuse University; University of Maryland, College Park; Columbia University Graduate School of Journalism
- Occupation: Journalist
- Spouse: Donald Moffitt
- Awards: Front Page Award (1972)

Ellen Louise Graham (December 30, 1943 - October 20, 2025) was an American journalist and a Pulitzer Prize finalist. She was a writer and editor at The Wall Street Journal from 1971 to 1998. After her retirement, she wrote columns for the Wall Street Journal on the challenges that come with retirement. She died on October 20, 2025 in Williamsburg, Virginia.

== Early life ==
Graham was born on December 30. 1943 in Glendale, California. Graham moved to Maryland during her teenage years where she graduated Bladensburg High School in 1961. At Bladensburg, she was regularly part of a high school youth series "The Teens Want to Know" where students talked to politicians and other public figures.

== Education ==
In 1961-1962, Graham attended Syracuse University. She had no plans to pursue journalism in college until a professor read Graham's papers aloud to other students. She transferred to the University of Maryland in 1965 and graduated with a degree in English Literature and Philosophy in 1968. She received her master's degree in journalismm at Columbia University Graduate School of Journalism in 1970.

== Career ==
Before working for The Wall Street Journal, Graham worked as a researcher for National Geographic Magazine while attending the University of Maryland. She started working at the WSJ in 1971, reporting, writing features, and editing at the paper's New York bureau.

== Awards ==
In 1972 at the Wall Street Journal, she received a Front Page Award for best feature of general interest for the story "A Good Death". Graham, along with the WSJ's Chris Adams and Michael Moss, were 1999 Pulitzer Prize finalists in National Reporting. They were nominated for "their reporting on the pitfalls faced by elderly Americans housed in commercial long-term facilities."
