= Dokun Akingbade =

Nigerian basketball player (born 1984)

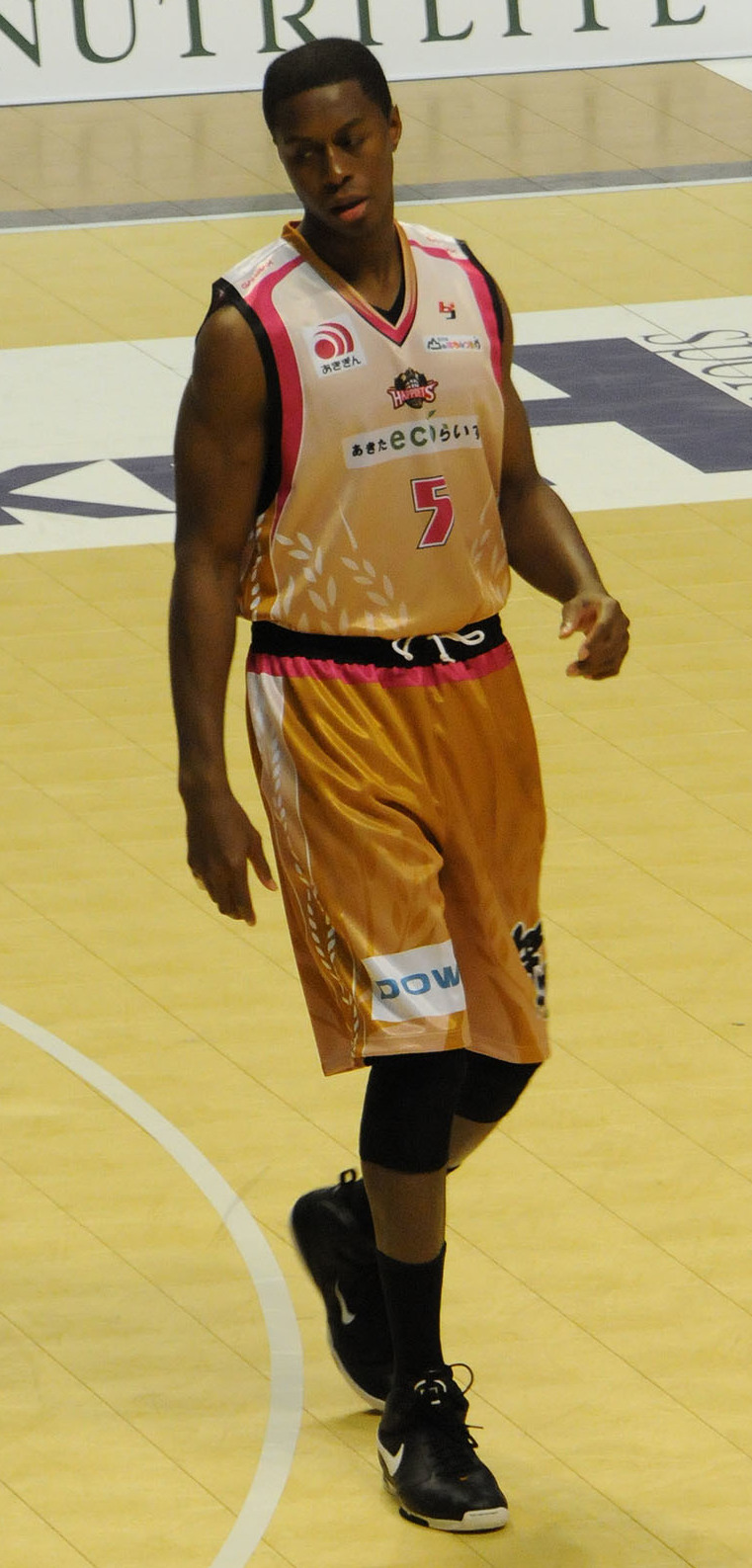
- Akingbade at Akita Municipal Gymnasium

Personal information
- Born: June 5, 1984 (age 42) Lagos, Nigeria
- Listed height: 207 cm (6 ft 9 in)
- Listed weight: 108 kg (238 lb)

Career information
- High school: Bladensburg (Bladensburg, Maryland)
- College: George Washington (2002–2007)
- NBA draft: 2007: undrafted
- Playing career: 2007–2013
- Position: Power forward/Center
- Number: 5

Career history
- 2007: Long Island PrimeTime
- 2007: AD Vagos
- 2007-2008: Vermont Frost Heaves
- 2008-2009: Niigata Albirex BB
- 2009-2010: KFUM Jamtland Basket
- 2010: BSC Raiffeisen Panthers Fürstenfeld
- 2010-2011: Akita Northern Happinets
- 2011-2012: Giants Düsseldorf
- 2012: Österreichische Basketball Bundesliga
- 2012-2013: Island Storm

Ayodokun Samuel Akingbade (born June 5, 1984) is a Nigerian former professional basketball player who played for the Akita Northern Happinets of the Japanese bj league. He currently serves for the United States Department of State.

== College statistics ==
Year	Team	GP	GS	MPG	FG%	3P%	FT%	RPG	APG	SPG	BPG	PPG
2002–03	George Washington	26	0	6.4	.350	.000	.375	1.38	0.00	0.23	0.15	0.65
2003–04	George Washington	8	0	1.5	.000	.000	.000	0.25	0.00	0.00	0.00	0.00
2004–05	George Washington	20	2	6.5	.438	.000	.500	1.30	0.00	0.15	0.35	1.75
2006–07	George Washington	32	31	22.8	.547	.000	.554	5.56	0.97	0.38	0.75	7.25
Career		86	33	12.1	.513	.000	.529	2.81	0.36	0.24	0.41	3.30

== Career statistics ==
Legend
GP	Games played	GS	Games started	MPG	Minutes per game
FG%	Field goal percentage	3P%	3-point field goal percentage	FT%	Free throw percentage
RPG	Rebounds per game	APG	Assists per game	SPG	Steals per game
BPG	Blocks per game	PPG	Points per game	**Bold**	Career high

=== Regular season ===
Year	Team	GP	GS	MPG	FG%	3P%	FT%	RPG	APG	SPG	BPG	PPG
2008–09	Niigata	33	30	32.9	.471	.000	.548	12.8	1.3	0.7	0.5	18.6
2009–10	Jämtland	36		28.5	.515	.000	.502	8.9	1.0	0.7	0.5	16.6
2010–11	Fürstenfeld	1		24.0	.333	.000	.429	6.0	0.0	0.0	1.0	9.0
2010–11	Akita	39	27	25.2	.470	.000	.478	11.3	0.6	0.2	0.8	9.3
2011–12	Düsseldorf	4		6.0	.375	.000	.667	0.8	0.5	0.0	0.0	2.0
2012–13	Island Storm	8	7	20.1	.400	.000	.345	4.88	1.88	0.25	0.25	7.25
Japan totals		72	57	28.7	.471	.000	.522	12.0	0.9	0.4	0.7	13.6

=== Playoffs ===
Year	Team	GP	GS	MPG	FG%	3P%	FT%	RPG	APG	SPG	BPG	PPG
2010-11	Akita	2		23.0	.400	.000	.462	10.0	0.0	0.0	0.5	9.0
2011-12	Düsseldorf	5		4.6	.333	.000	.500	1.6	0.0	0.0	0.0	1.8

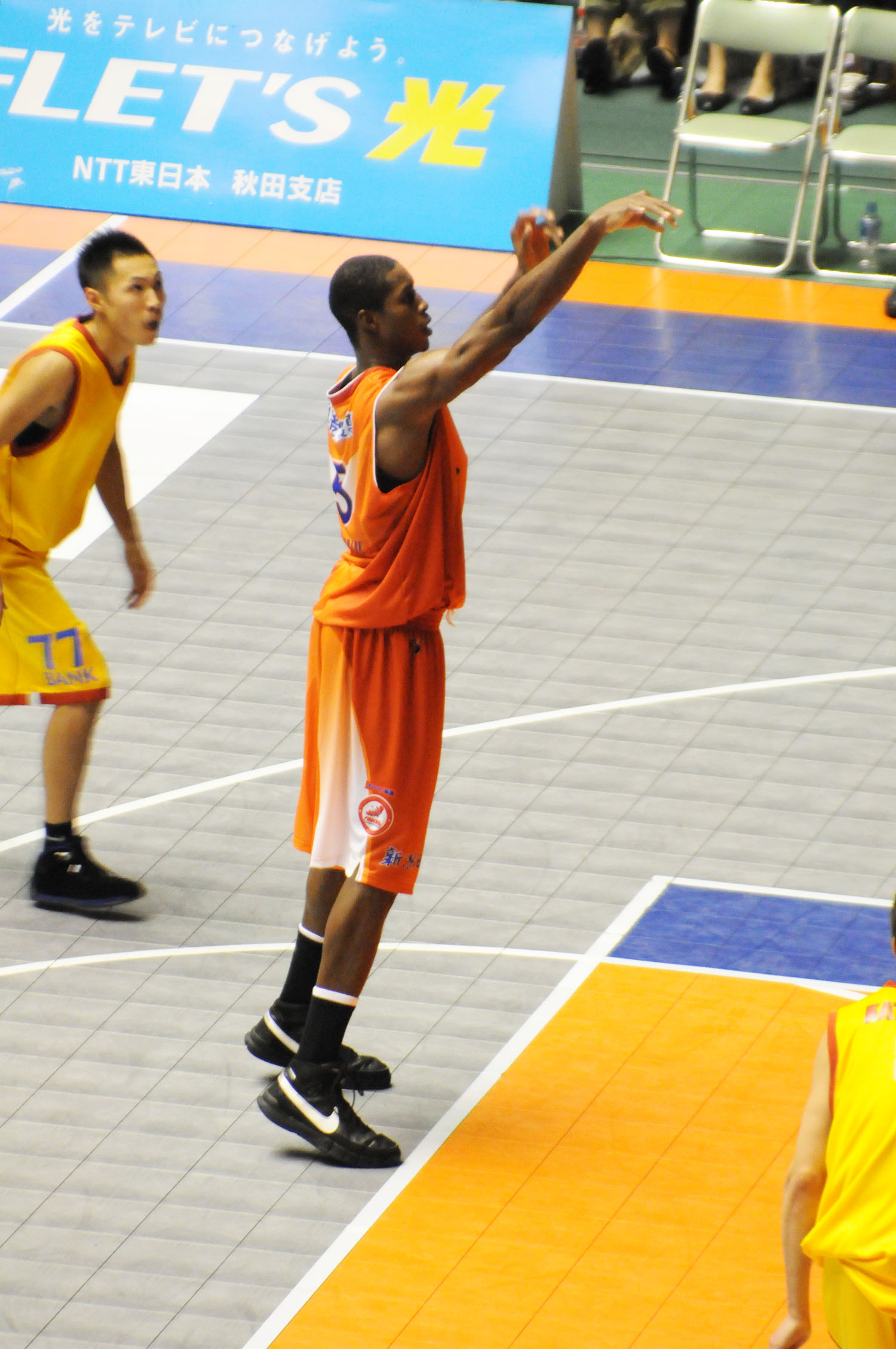
