= Colmar Manor, Maryland =

- Town
- Town of Colmar Manor
- Flag Seal

- Location of Colmar Manor, Maryland
- Coordinates: 38°56′2″N 76°56′49″W
- Country: United States of America
- State: Maryland
- County: Prince George's
- Incorporated: 1927

Area
  - Total: 0.48 sq mi (1.24 km^{2})
  - Land: 0.43 sq mi (1.11 km^{2})
  - Water: 0.050 sq mi (0.13 km^{2})
- Elevation: 30 ft (9 m)

Population (2020)
  - Total: 1,588
  - Density: 3,705.9/sq mi (1,430.87/km^{2})
- Time zone: UTC-5 (Eastern (EST))
  - Summer (DST): UTC-4 (EDT)
- ZIP code: 20722
- Area codes: 301, 240
- FIPS code: 24-18850
- GNIS feature ID: 0597270
- Website: https://colmarmanor.org/

Colmar Manor is a town located in Prince George's County, Maryland, United States. As of the 2020 census, the town had a population of 1,588. As the town developed at the beginning of the 20th century, it assumed a name derived from its proximity to the District of Columbia—the first syllable of Columbia and that of Maryland were combined to form "Colmar". Colmar Manor was incorporated in 1927.

== History ==
=== 19th century ===
The town is home to Dueling Creek, formerly in Bladensburg, Maryland, a small waterway that because of its secluded location was a popular site for dueling. Duels were banned in neighboring Washington, D.C., but legal in Maryland, and Dueling Creek was the site for more than 50 duels between 1808 and 1868. The most famous duel fought on the site was on March 22, 1820, between Stephen Decatur and James Barron. Decatur was mortally wounded in the exchange.

During the War of 1812, on August 24, 1814, the area was the scene of the Battle of Bladensburg. The place became a battlefield again in the early days of the Civil War when Confederate troops mounted an assault on Battery Jameson, Fort Lincoln, now northeast Washington, D.C., which was one of a number Union defensive forts built around the nation's capital to protect it from capture. The remains of Fort Lincoln are located on the hillside that is now a part of Fort Lincoln Cemetery.

=== 20th century ===
In 1912, the Capitol Cemetery of Prince George's County was incorporated on the Washington, D.C., boundary line. Directly north of the cemetery was the Shreve estate. The Shreve house was destroyed in the 1890s. The 260-acre (1.1 km^{2}) farm site was used by the 6,000 jobless men from Ohio who descended on the Capitol in 1894 as "Coxey's Army". Bladensburg Road traversed the area, becoming more heavily traveled in the 1920s, and eventually became designated as U.S. Route 1. Part of the former Shreve estate was subdivided into building lots in 1918. The lots were 50 feet (15 m) wide by 100 feet (30 m) deep, arranged along a grid pattern of streets. The streets were originally named after President Woodrow Wilson (1913–21), members of his cabinet, and other prominent men of the era. Some time later, the streets were renamed to conform to the system in use in the District of Columbia. The location of the development within the first service area of the Washington Suburban Sanitary Commission offered homeowners modern water and sewer lines. The houses constructed were modest one- and two-story wood-frame buildings. In 1931, the town's streets were paved and gutters were installed. A concrete block municipal building was constructed in 1934, followed by the construction of a brick schoolhouse in 1935. In 1959, a municipal building was constructed to house the town's administrative offices and police department.

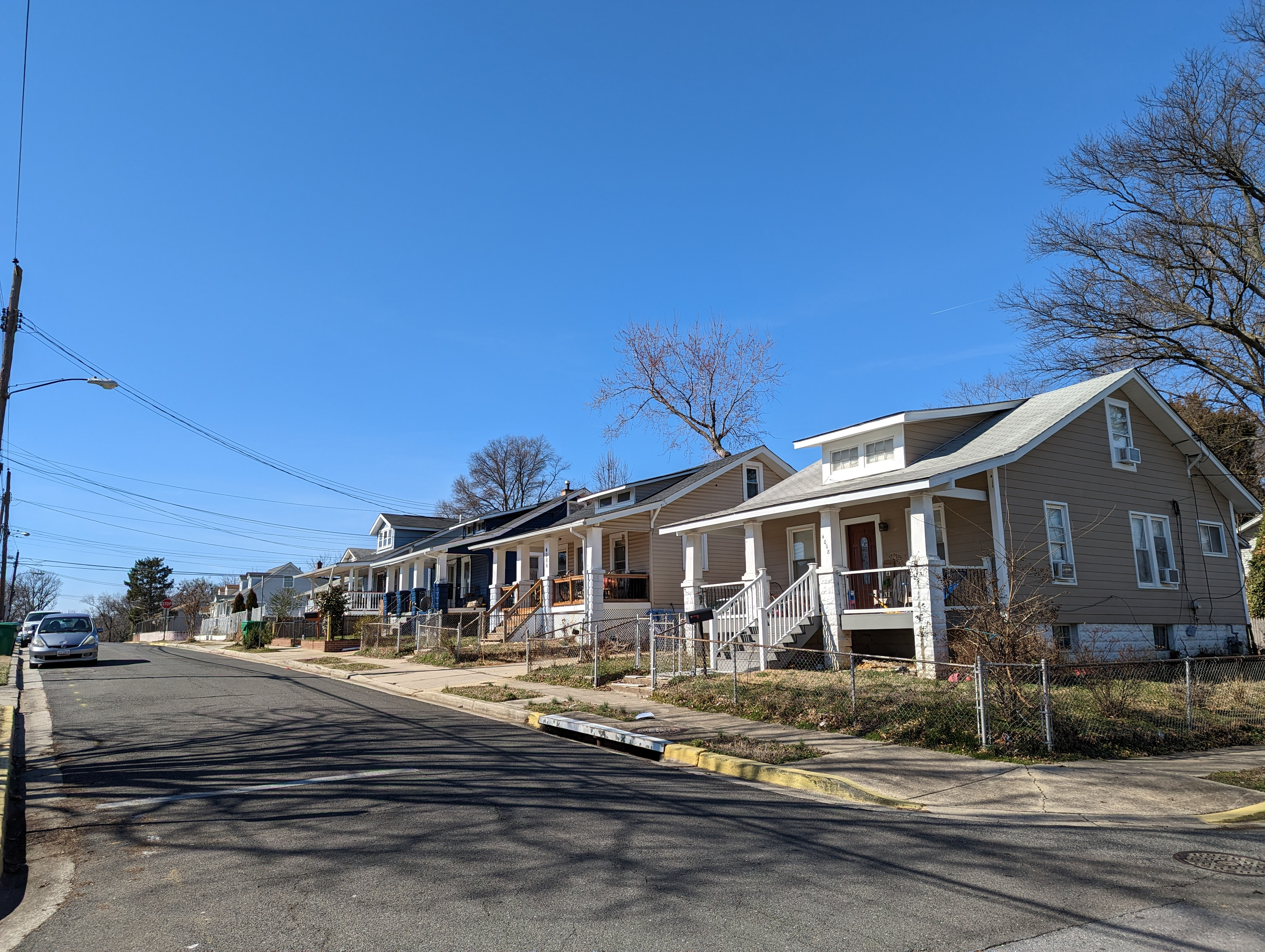
Bungalows in Colmar Manor, Maryland

During the second half of the 20th century, the area along Bladensburg Road, now known as Alternate Route 1, became lined with commercial establishments, and much of the housing stock was used as rental units. A large urban renewal project in the 1970s and 1980s resulted in the demolition of many commercial properties along Bladenburg Road. The old businesses were replaced with new structures such as fast food restaurants and a shopping center. Streets and houses were also improved. The Colmar Manor Community Park was established along the west bank of the Anacostia River in the 1970s on the site of a sanitary landfill.

In 1999, Colmar Manor, Bladensburg, and Cottage City were lauded by the Joint Center for Sustainable Communities for their collaboration with Prince George's County for the Port Towns Revitalization Initiative, which created a common Port Towns identity for the towns; encouraged businesses development through infrastructure and facade improvements; acquisition of historic properties and plans for their reuse; and reconstruction of the Bladensburg waterfront, marina and the Bladensburg Waterfront Park.

== Geography ==
Colmar Manor is located at 38°56'2" North, 76°56'49" West (38.933811, -76.947077).

According to the United States Census Bureau, the town has a total area of 0.52 square miles (1.35 km^{2}), of which 0.47 square miles (1.22 km^{2}) is land and 0.05 square miles (0.13 km^{2}) is water.

== Demographics ==
Historical population
Census	Pop.	Note	%±
1930	1,225		—
1940	1,480		20.8%
1950	1,732		17.0%
1960	1,772		2.3%
1970	1,715		−3.2%
1980	1,286		−25.0%
1990	1,249		−2.9%
2000	1,257		0.6%
2010	1,404		11.7%
2020	1,588		13.1%
U.S. Decennial Census

=== Racial and ethnic composition ===
Colmar Manor town, Maryland – Racial and ethnic composition Note: the US Census treats Hispanic/Latino as an ethnic category. This table excludes Latinos from the racial categories and assigns them to a separate category. Hispanics/Latinos may be of any race.
Race / Ethnicity (NH = Non-Hispanic)	Pop 2000	Pop 2010	Pop 2020	% 2000	% 2010	% 2020
White alone (NH)	258	167	98	20.53%	11.89%	6.17%
Black or African American alone (NH)	601	473	389	47.81%	33.69%	24.50%
Native American or Alaska Native alone (NH)	1	1	5	0.08%	0.07%	0.31%
Asian alone (NH)	130	99	141	10.34%	7.05%	8.88%
Native Hawaiian or Pacific Islander alone (NH)	0	0	0	0.00%	0.00%	0.00%
Other race alone (NH)	6	6	13	0.48%	0.43%	0.82%
Mixed race or Multiracial (NH)	37	26	17	2.94%	1.85%	1.07%
Hispanic or Latino (any race)	224	632	925	17.82%	45.01%	58.25%
Total	1,257	1,404	1,588	100.00%	100.00%	100.00%

=== 2020 census ===
As of the 2020 census, Colmar Manor had a population of 1,588. The median age was 35.0 years. 26.1% of residents were under the age of 18 and 10.2% of residents were 65 years of age or older. For every 100 females there were 103.1 males, and for every 100 females age 18 and over there were 101.4 males age 18 and over.

100.0% of residents lived in urban areas, while 0.0% lived in rural areas.

There were 404 households in Colmar Manor, of which 47.0% had children under the age of 18 living in them. Of all households, 47.3% were married-couple households, 13.6% were households with a male householder and no spouse or partner present, and 31.2% were households with a female householder and no spouse or partner present. About 14.6% of all households were made up of individuals and 7.7% had someone living alone who was 65 years of age or older.

There were 418 housing units, of which 3.3% were vacant. The homeowner vacancy rate was 1.8% and the rental vacancy rate was 1.2%.

=== 2010 census ===
As of the census of 2010, there were 1,404 people, 374 households, and 282 families residing in the town. The population density was 2,987.2 inhabitants per square mile (1,153.4/km^{2}). There were 415 housing units at an average density of 883.0 per square mile (340.9/km^{2}). The racial makeup of the town was 27.1% White, 35.0% African American, 0.1% Native American, 7.2% Asian, 26.8% from other races, and 3.8% from two or more races. Hispanic or Latino of any race were 45.0% of the population.

There were 374 households, of which 45.7% had children under the age of 18 living with them, 47.6% were married couples living together, 19.3% had a female householder with no husband present, 8.6% had a male householder with no wife present, and 24.6% were non-families. 18.4% of all households were made up of individuals, and 5.6% had someone living alone who was 65 years of age or older. The average household size was 3.75 and the average family size was 4.07.

The median age in the town was 32.9 years. 27.2% of residents were under the age of 18; 10.2% were between the ages of 18 and 24; 31.1% were from 25 to 44; 23.7% were from 45 to 64; and 7.6% were 65 years of age or older. The gender makeup of the town was 52.1% male and 47.9% female.

=== 2000 census ===
As of the census of 2000, there were 1,257 people, 384 households, and 273 families residing in the town. The population density was 2,804.9 inhabitants per square mile (1,083.0/km^{2}). There were 411 housing units at an average density of 917.1 per square mile (354.1/km^{2}). The racial makeup of the town was 24.90% White, 48.77% African American, 0.08% Native American, 10.34% Asian, 0.00% Pacific Islander, 12.41% from other races, and 3.50% from two or more races. 17.82% of the population were Hispanic or Latino of any race.

There were 384 households, out of which 33.6% had children under the age of 18 living with them, 45.1% were married couples living together, 18.5% had a female householder with no husband present, and 28.9% were non-families. 25.3% of all households were made up of individuals, and 6.8% had someone living alone who was 65 years of age or older. The average household size was 3.27 and the average family size was 3.92.

In the town, the population was spread out, with 28.2% under the age of 18, 9.4% from 18 to 24, 28.0% from 25 to 44, 24.3% from 45 to 64, and 10.1% who were 65 years of age or older. The median age was 36 years. For every 100 females, there were 94.0 males. For every 100 females age 18 and over, there were 85.6 males.

The median income for a household in the town was $43,906, and the median income for a family was $46,354. Males had a median income of $34,750 versus $29,844 for females. The per capita income for the town was $16,528. 5.9% of the population and 4.9% of families were below the poverty line. Out of the total population, 6.9% of those under the age of 18 and 4.9% of those 65 and older were living below the poverty line.

== Bordering areas ==
- Cottage City (northwest)
- North Brentwood (northwest)
- Brentwood (northwest)
- Mount Rainier (northwest)
- Washington, DC
- Bladensburg (northwest)

== Government ==
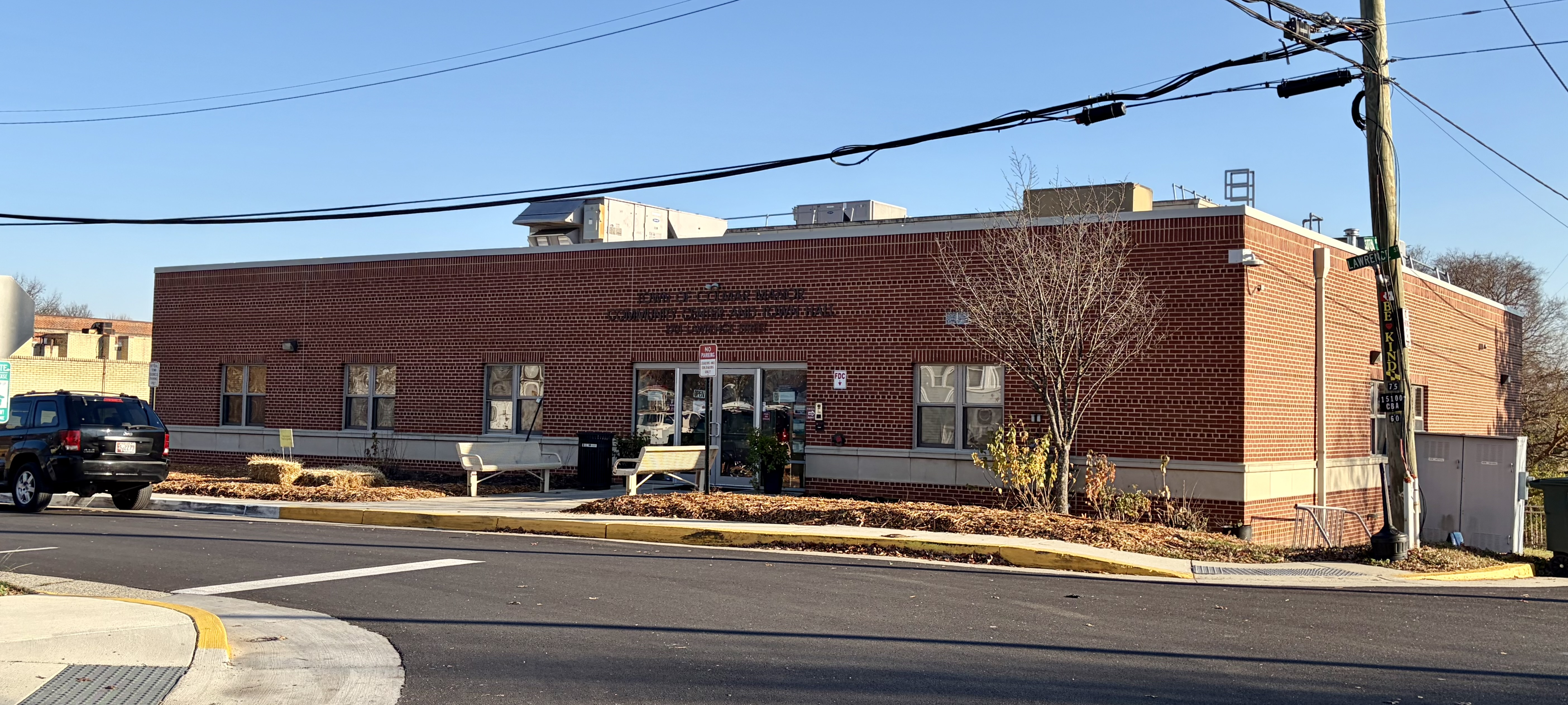
Colmar Manor's Community Center and Town Hall

The town has its own police called the Colmar Manor Police Department. It consists of a chief of police, a corporal, two full time officers, and two part time officers.

== Transportation ==
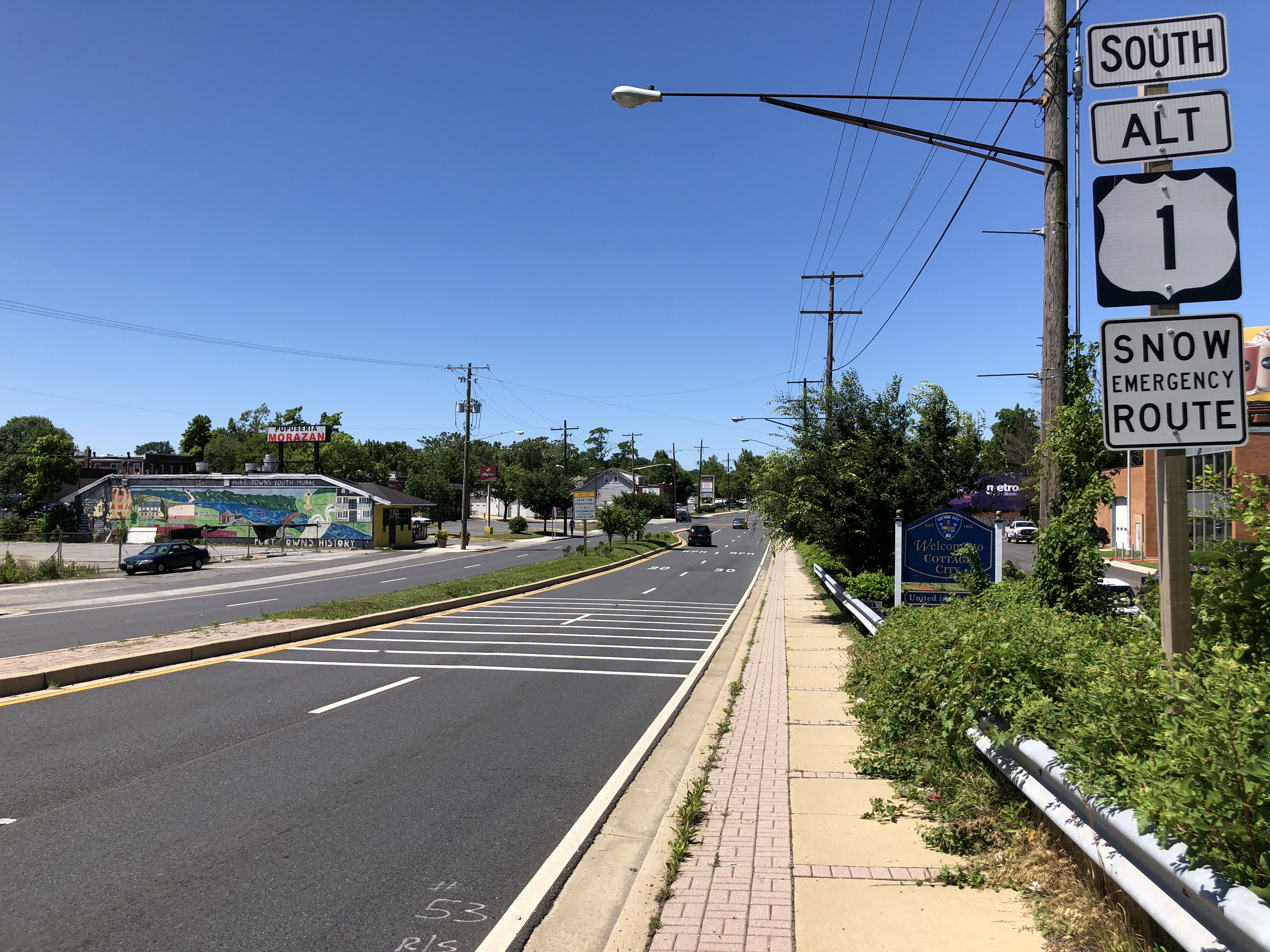
US 1 Alternate southbound on the edge of Colmar Manor

The only state highway serving Colmar Manor is U.S. Route 1 Alternate. US 1 Alternate follows Bladensburg Road along Colmar Manor's border with Cottage City, connecting the town to Washington, D.C., and Bladensburg.

== Education ==
Colmar Manor is zoned to Prince George's County Public Schools:

- Rogers Heights Elementary School
- William Wirt Middle School
- Bladensburg High School

== Notable person ==
- John Sylvester White, television actor, best known as high school vice principal/principal, Mr. Michael Woodman on Welcome Back, Kotter, was a boyhood resident and son of Colmar Manor's first mayor.
