= Carol Heifetz Neiman =

- Born: January 3, 1937; Chicago, Illinois
- Died: March 3, 1990 (aged 53); Los Angeles, California
- Resting place: Hillside Memorial Park Cemetery
- Education: School of the Art Institute of Chicago
- Movement: Feminist art movement, Modernism, Realism, Surrealism, Xerox arti
- Spouse: Lionel Margolin (divorced)

Carol Heifetz Neiman (1937 – 1990) was an American artist who was a member of the feminist art movement of the 1970s, known for her surrealist and xerox art. She also created etchings, and worked in pencil, pastels, and mixed media and was a painter.

== Early life ==
Carol Neiman was born in Chicago, Illinois in 1937 to Benjamin Neiman and Lillian Heifetz. She married Lionel Margolin in 1957. They first moved to New York for his medical residency at Bellevue Hospital, where Ms. Neiman taught 8th grade art class in New York. They moved to Los Angeles in 1961, and had two children.

As standards changed for taking a husband's name in marriage, Carol Heifetz Neiman's name changed from Carol Margolin, to Carol Neiman-Margolin until her divorce in 1980; then to Carol Neiman, and finally adopting the matrilineal Carol Heifetz Neiman.

== Career ==
=== Education ===
Neiman studied at the School of the Art Institute of Chicago and attended Newcomb College in New Orleans, at Northwestern University, and the University of Southern California with many artists, such as Francis de Erdely, George Cohen, Ida Kohlmeyer and J. L. Steg.

=== Work ===
In 1965, Neiman worked primarily in oil and pastel. She moved to a studio space in 1968, and in 1972, Neiman founded Art/West Fine Arts Center, a co-working collaborative in West Los Angeles that provided studio space for several artists. In 1975, Neiman—as Carol Neiman-Margolin—held a two-woman show, "This Venice," with Carol Quint at the Los Angeles Museum of Science and Industry on material from Venice Beach, California.

Prior to the LAMSI show, Neiman's work was shown under her name Carol Margolin at venues including Santa Monica College, Woman's Building (Los Angeles), Oklahoma Art Center, Springfield Museum of Fine Arts, Butler Institute of American Art, Kent State University, and the Audubon Artists Society in New York. At that time her work was in the collection of the California State University and Colleges.

The LAMSI show completed a transition from previous work that was in a style of either realism or modernism to work that was often feminist in subject matter and increasingly surrealist in style. Neiman also had a one-woman show at the Brand Museum, integrating details of the physical location with revelations about femininity.

Neiman was an early experimenter in the realm of technology-assisted art, with a series based on color Xerox art combining iterations of xerox and prismacolor pencil. In 1987, Carol Neiman's color Xerox work was in the International Society of Copier Artists' "Bookworks and Prints" exhibition which opened in Bologna and is traveling throughout Italy.

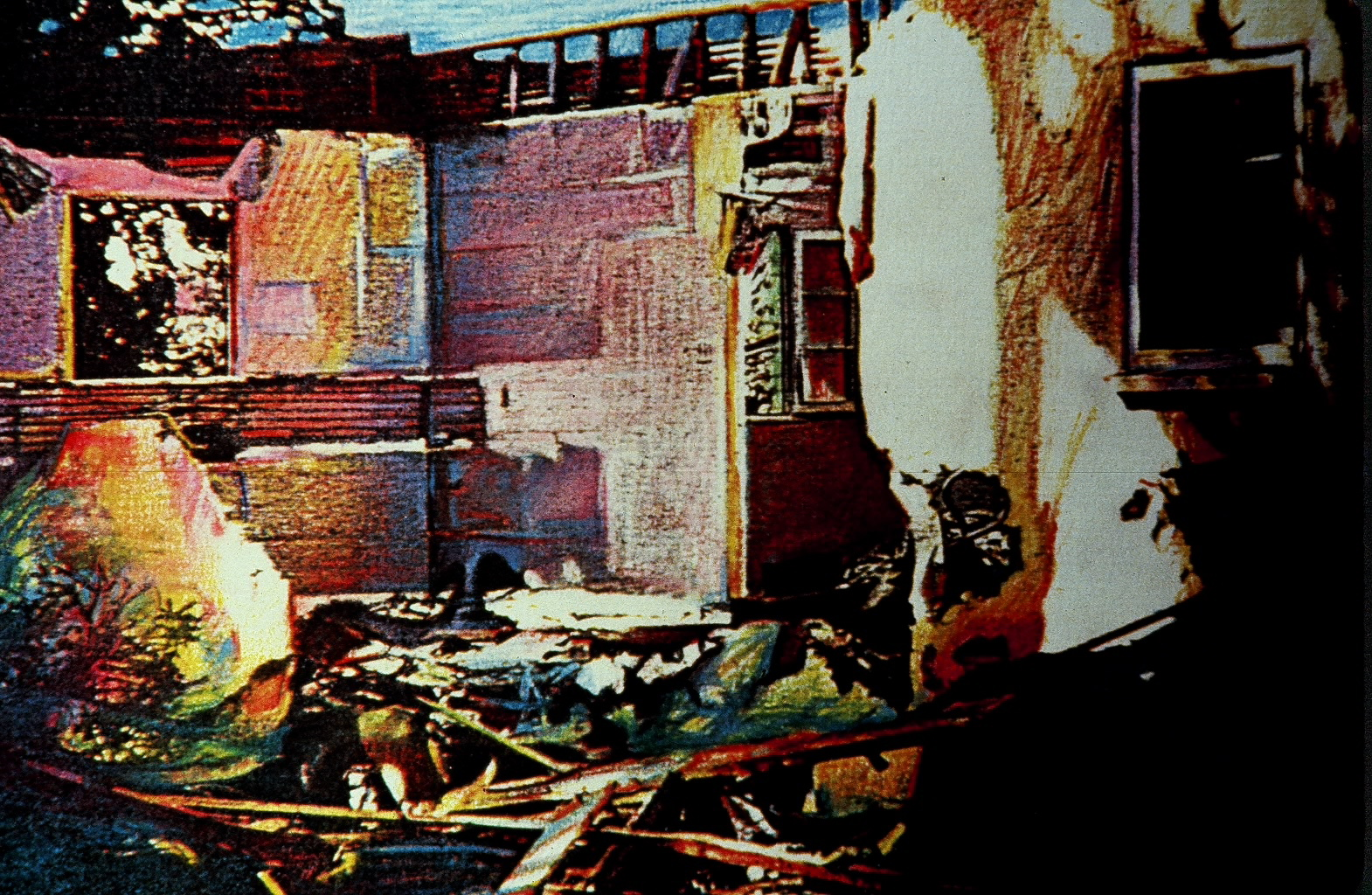
Homewrecked Series: What is This Thing Called Love c. 1988, color xerox

Neiman also began experimenting with Computer art using a Tandy computer in the late 1980s.

In 1989, Neiman was included in Exposures, Women & Their Art: written by Betty Ann Brown and Arlene Raven with photographs by Kenna Love and a foreword by Alessandra Comini.

This book featured many prominent women artists: Judy Chicago, Judy Baca, Cheri Gaulke, Ruth Weisberg, Joyce Treiman, June Wayne, Melissa Zink, Joan Semmel, Jeri Allyn, Ann Page, Jean Edelstein, Nancy Fried, Betye Saar, Laurie Pincus, Kahy Jacobi, Phyllis Bramson, Ellen Berman, Kim Yasuda, Kaylynn Sullivan, Nancy Grossman, Gretchen Lanes, Joanne Brigham, Jaune Quick-to-See Smith, Madden Harkness, Bibiana Suarez, Lili Lakich, Michiko Itatani, Miriam Schapiro, Deborah Remington, Sylvia Sleigh, Sharon Kopriva, Younhee Paik, Connie Jenkins, Margaret Wharton, Hollis Sigler, Nancy Bowen, Ida Applebroog, Patricia Gonzalez, Cynthia Carlson, Ruth Ann Anderson, Nancy Spero, Nancy Chunn, Susanna Coffey, Dee Wolf, Jere Van Syoc, D.J. Hall, Linda Vallejo, Florence Pierce, and Rachel Rosenthal.

In 1990, Neiman was a recipient of the Vesta Award from The Woman's Building.

[Surrealists] endeavored, according to Breton, to make manifest that certain point for the mind from which life and death, the real and the imaginary, the past and the future, the communicable and the incommunicable, the high and the low cease being perceived as contradictions." Carol Neiman is a contemporary surrealist. Breton's words could serve as a canny description of the mental states depicted in her complex and often unsettling compositions.

=== Involvement in Feminism ===
Neiman was involved in events regarding the visibility of women artists. In 1986, Neiman was a co-coordinator of the artists Women Artists Visibility Event (WAVE).

Neiman was president-elect of the Women's Caucus for Art at the time of her death in 1990.

== See also ==
- Feminist art movement in the United States
- Women artists
