= Emma Willard School =

Private school in Troy, New York, US

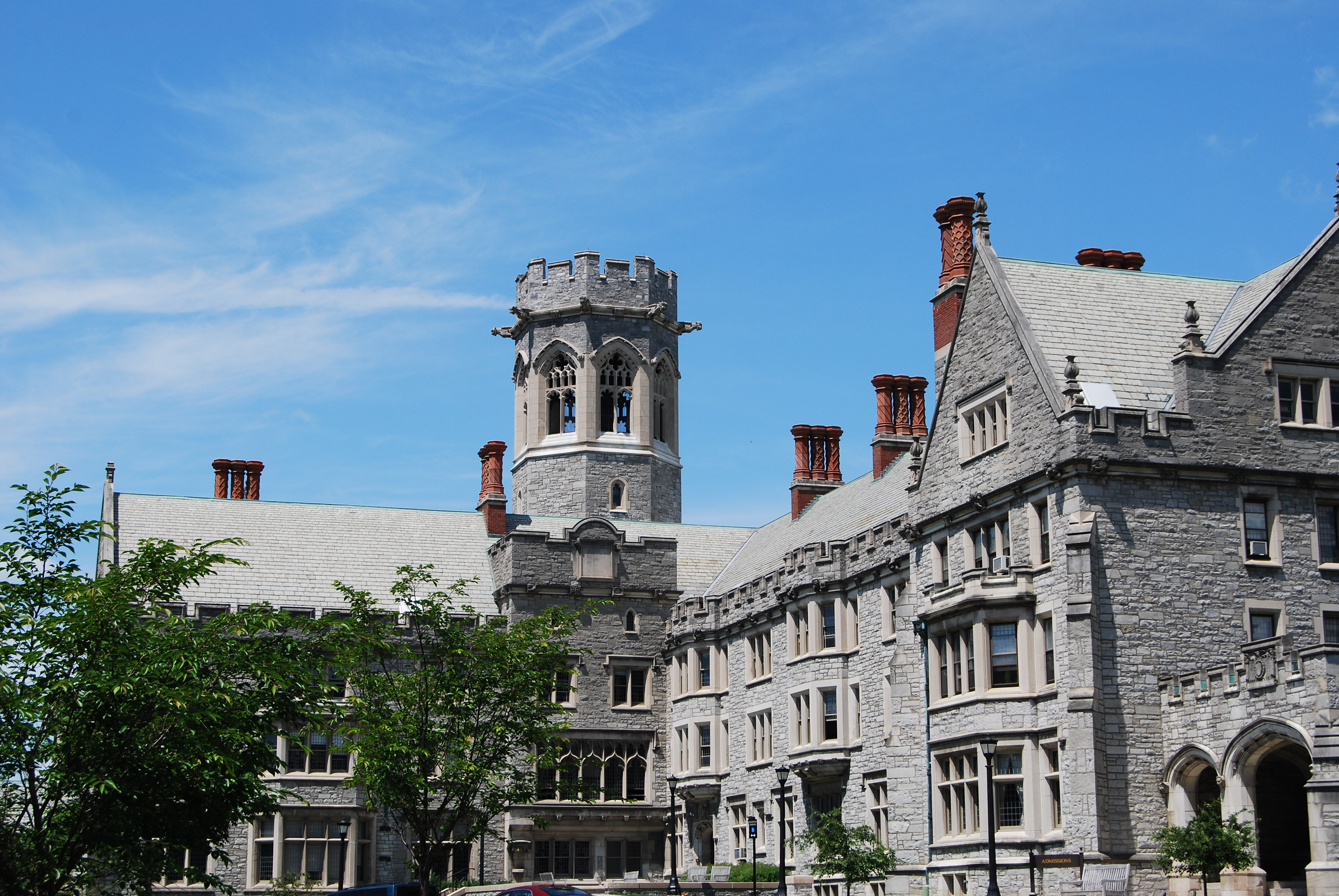

Location
- 285 Pawling Avenue; Troy, New York 12180; United States; 42°42′45″N 73°39′48″W

Information
- Former name: Troy Female Seminary
- Type: Private, college-prep, day and boarding
- Motto: Gaudet Patientia Duris (Patience Rejoices in Adversity)
- Established: 1814; 212 years ago
- NCES School ID: 00939731 00939731
- Teaching staff: 45 (FTE)
- Grades: 9–12
- Enrollment: 356 (2022-2023)
- Average class size: 12
- Student to teacher ratio: 8.1
- Campus size: 137 acres
- Campus type: Rural
- Colors: Black; Red; White
- Team name: Jesters
- Accreditation: NYSAIS
- Website: Official website
- Emma Willard School
- U.S. National Register of Historic Places
- Area: 55 acres (22 ha)
- Architect: Fred M. Cummings
- Architectural style: Georgian, Jacobethan Revival
- NRHP reference No.: 79001625
- Added to NRHP: August 30, 1979

Emma Willard School, originally called Troy Female Seminary and often referred to simply as Emma, is an independent university-preparatory day and boarding school for young women located in Troy, New York. Located on Mount Ida, it offers grades 9–12 and postgraduate coursework.

The first women's higher education institution in the United States, it was founded by women's rights advocate Emma Willard in 1814 (first in Middlebury, Vermont, as Middlebury Female Seminary, later moved to Troy and renamed Troy Female Seminary). As of 2026, it had an endowment of $119 million.In 2018, the school was ranked by The Post-Standard as the #1 private school in Upstate New York.

== Academics ==
Emma Willard is an independent college-preparatory day and boarding school enrolling students in grades 9–12 and post-graduate studies. Class sizes are kept at a 16-student maximum; the typical student to teacher ratio is 6 to 1. 83% of the faculty hold advanced degrees. Advanced Placement classes are no longer offered as the school switched to their own system of advanced courses called Advanced Studies (AS) classes.

Most students take five courses each semester. Classes meet three times each week for fifty to seventy minute periods, though seminars, art classes, and other elective sections may for varying lengths of time. An ESL program offers intermediate and advanced-level curriculum for international students. Core requirements for graduation include a minimum of four units of English; three units of history, foreign language, mathematics; two units of lab science (one each in biology and physics), two units in the arts, and one-fourth unit in health. All students must fulfill a community service requirement and take physical education or its equivalent each semester in the ninth, tenth, and eleventh grades. Seniors must take at least ten weeks.

Emma Willard offers inquiry-based classes across all disciplines. In the fall of 2005, Emma Willard began its Physics First program for all incoming ninth-grade students. It has students take a basic physics course in the ninth grade rather than the biology course that is standard in most public schools.

== Educational philosophy ==
The guiding educational philosophy at Emma Willard School is based on three pillars: intellectual flexibility, purpose & community, and equity & justice. Each student is encouraged to develop fully in all areas of life: as a strong intellectual in a variety of disciplines, as a practitioner of her chosen passions, as a social member of the community, and as a responsible global citizen in her future.

In keeping with that philosophy of personal development providing its own benchmarks, class rank is not provided. The grading system uses letter and number grades: A, A−, B+, B, B−, C+, C, C−, etc., usually accompanied by a number indicating where on the spectrum the individual student falls. Emma Willard's independent-study program, Practicum, allows students to pursue coursework at area colleges, career internships, community service, and individualized athletic training and competition off-campus for academic credit. Over one-third of the students participate in Practicum each year.

Emma Willard students worked to make Emma Willard School the first fair trade high school in the United States in 2010.

== History ==
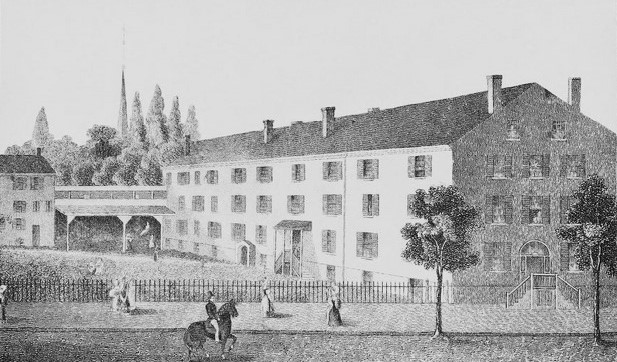
Troy Female Seminary, 1822

Emma Willard School traces its roots to the Middlebury Female Seminary, founded by Emma Hart Willard in 1814. In 1821, Willard moved her school to Troy, New York, and opened it as the Troy Female Seminary to provide young women with the same higher education as their male peers. Prior to the school's founding, young women had been unable to pursue the advanced curricular offerings in mathematics, classical languages, and the sciences that were taught to their male counterparts. Her husband, John Willard managed the school's finances and served as the in-house physician until his death in 1825.

Having taught for several years, Emma Willard perceived the egregious disparity in what girls learned compared to boys. In 1819, Willard promoted a comprehensive secondary and post-secondary female educational institution, which would require funding by the State of New York. Her address to the office of New York's "innovative" governor DeWitt Clinton met with initial success. However, the New York State legislature at Albany, on hearing her request, responded with mixed sentiment, and ultimately rejected her proposal. Many of the wives of prominent men steadfastly supported and promoted her educational agenda to their friends and associates. Thereafter, the City's Common Council eventually raised $4,000 that would facilitate Willard's purchase of a suitable flagship building for her proposed seminary for young women.

She had already obtained inexpensive accommodation in a nearby historic (already for the 1800s) Waterford, New York, landmark farm. There, she rented two nondescript long and narrow stone structures, former pre-Colonial Dutch estate's outbuildings in a picturesque setting along the Mohawk River. The property's border still abuts the Erie Canal's first but long-defunct stone lock, near a major point of the Mohawk's primary arterial confluence into the Hudson River. However, in early 1821, a critical funds shortage from to a brief economic downturn that had affected the region forced her to close her Waterford Academy.

Toward the close of 1821, Willard secured $4,000 in funding and relocated to Troy, downstream from Waterford along the Hudson River. The Albany Academy for Boys had been established just downstream in March 1813 by Philip Schuyler Van Rensselaer, who founded the Rensselaer Polytechnic Institute (RPI), a college for men, in Troy in 1824.

Willard was able to formally found the Troy Female Seminary "for young ladies of means", becoming "the first school in the country to provide girls the same educational opportunities given to boys". From its establishment in 1821 until 1872, the seminary admitted 12,000 students. The Troy Female Seminary promoted the education of young girls as well as women teachers in training. The seminary provided tuition on credit for students who could not afford it, with the agreement that those students would be teaching assistants and eventually become teachers themselves.

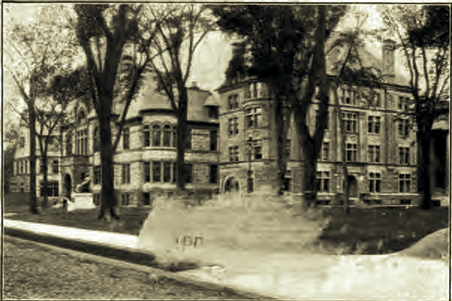
Emma Willard School for Girls (1905)

That type of on-credit tuition led to the growing reputation of the Troy Female Seminary as the demand for female teachers increased during the nineteenth century. Willard advocated for publicly supported female seminaries by asserting the necessity of educating as many women as possible in the United States, a task, she pointed out, that was too large for private institutions alone to undertake. Willard also promoted educational reform by emphasizing that women were capable of intellectual evidence in any field and demanded for women to be trained for professions. The school was immediately successful, and it graduated many great thinkers, including noted social reformer and suffragist Elizabeth Cady Stanton. Willard remained the head of the seminary until 1838, when she handed it over to her son. In 1895, the school was renamed The Emma Willard School for Girls. In 1910, a new campus was built for the school on Mount Ida.

=== Educational philosophy and academics ===
Her educational philosophy for the Troy Female Seminary was to "educate the women for responsible motherhood and train some of them to be teachers," with a curriculum that was similar to the contemporary men's colleges. The curriculum included courses in mathematics, science, modern languages, Latin, history, philosophy, geography, and literature. The Troy Female Seminary School also provided the services of Normal Schools by giving women the opportunity to become teacher's assistants and spread women's education throughout the United States. The alumnae of the Troy School were unusual among contemporary women in their pursuit of work beyond the "private sphere" of the home. These alumnae established numerous Normal Schools, institutions that promoted the study of arts and sciences, and expanded into other professions involving the sciences and law.

== Co-curricular pursuits ==
Co-curricular pursuits include sports, choir, orchestra, a cappella groups, the student newspaper, a literary arts magazine (Triangle), model UN, county-champion Mock Trial team, speech and debate, quiz team, various clubs, and the yearbook, among others.

As it is a fair trade school, students from EcoEmm Fair Trade Club study global social justice issues and help educate the community, as well as sell fair trade goods at the school. Students also sign petitions fighting human rights abuses worldwide. Each year, students and faculty take service trips to countries in the developing world so Emma's women can see the world and make the changes they discuss in their classrooms throughout the year. Emma Willard is also the first boarding school to become a member of the international Round-Square program. In 2009, students and faculty traveled to Africa and to Casa de los Angeles in San Miguel de Allende, Mexico, to care for the children of poor working mothers.

== Traditions ==
Every year the senior class conduct a play called Revels. The plot mimics a medieval Christmas celebration set in a manor house. The parts are kept secret until the play. The first Revels performance was in 1915. The seniors also control a triangular patch of grass in the center of campus called the Senior Triangle. Only seniors and alumnae are permitted to walk on the grass unless invited by a senior or alumna. Juniors "take over" this patch of grass after the seniors leave for senior retreat at the end of the year during Triangle Takeover.

Juniors receive their class ring through their ring sister, who dresses them up throughout Ring Week and gives a half a quote to a member of the faculty for them to find before the week commences with Ring Dinner in which the ring is presented.

Other traditions include hall tea where once a week students gather with their halls to bond; Eventide, the winter concert; sophomore tree decorating; Peanuts and Shells (a version of secret Santa); May Day, in which freshman participate in a maypole dance and a May Queen who is voted on by the student body is crowned; and Principal's Play Day, a secret day chosen by the head of school in which class is cancelled.

== Student demographics ==
In the 2019-20 school year students came from 24 US states, and over 36 foreign countries. In fall 2010 enrollment increased by 3%; the total student population was 319 (203 boarding, 116 day).

It has a diverse population: of the 339 students, 55 are students of color (according to guidelines established by the National Association of Independent Schools), 88 are international students, and 45 have an alumna or current sister relationship to the school.

It maintains 13 Davis Scholarships, and 10 Capital District Scholarships.

Of the 440 applicants for fall 2010, 149 (34%) were offered admission and 102 enrolled.

As of 2019, 42% of students are on financial aid.

== Notable alumnae ==
List of Emma Willard Alumnae

- Eunice Newton Foote: the first scientist known to have experimented on the warming effect of sunlight on different gases
- Laura Benét: Poet and author
- Elizabeth Cady Stanton : Leader of the women's suffrage movement
- Olivia Slocum Sage: Founder of the Sage Colleges
- Mary Arthur McElroy: Sister and First Lady during her brother President Chester Arthur's term
- Lily Spencer-Churchill, Duchess of Marlborough (born Lillian Price of Troy, NY): American heiress and socialite, also known as the Duchess of Marlborough during her marriage to George Charles Spencer-Churchill, 8th Duke of Marlborough and Lady William Beresford during her marriage to Lord William Leslie de la Poer Beresford
- Cynthia Roberts Gorton: writer
- Nancy Fowler McCormick: Philanthropist, member of the McCormick family
- Nannie Scott: Wife of American entrepreneur and founder of Marshall Field and Company, Marshall Field
- Frances Adeline Seward : Wife of William Henry Seward.
- Annie Jack, the first Canadian professional woman garden writer
- Solita Solano: American writer, poet, and journalist
- Jennifer von Mayrhauser: Emmy-nominated costume designer who has received an Obie for Sustained Excellence
- Casey Johnston: Fitness writer and influencer
- Justine Johnstone: Broadway and silent movie star
- Sara Lee Schupf : Namesake of Sara Lee baked goods
- Jane Fonda : Academy Award-winning actress
- Jane Wales: CEO of the Global Philanthropy Forum, president and CEO of the World Affairs Council and vice president of Philanthropy and Society at the Aspen Institute, co-host of the NPR interview show It's Your World
- Kirsten Gillibrand: United States Senator from New York
- Ruth Pine Furniss: Author of short stories and novels
- Clara Harrison Stranahan, author; founder and trustee of Barnard College
- Jean Buttner: businesswoman, former CEO of Valueline and trustee of Skidmore College
- Kendra Stearns O'Donnell: first female head of Phillips Exeter Academy
- Mary Lake Polan: First female chair of clinical department at Stanford University Medical School
- Elizabeth L. Colton: Founder/executive director, International Museum of Women, San Francisco
- Jessica Todd Harper: photographer
- Elizabeth Cody Kimmel: children's book author
- Erminnie A. Smith: geologist and an anthropologist at the Smithsonian Institution's Bureau of American Ethnology
- Peggy Ellliot Wayburn: author, wife of environmentalist and recipient of the Presidential Medal of Freedom Edgar Wayburn
- Sarah Brown Ingersoll Cooper: philanthropist and educator
- Martha Reed Mitchell: philanthropist and socialite
- Harriet Maria Allen Jackson: water-colourist and mother of American painter, Civil War veteran, geological survey photographer and an explorer William Henry Jackson
- Alma Lutz: feminist and activist for equal rights and woman suffrage
- Constance Roseblum: biographer and author, editor for the New York Times
- Susan Daitch: writer and novelist
- Mary Heimann: historian and professor at Cardiff University
- Nancy Spector: museum curator who has held positions at the Guggenheim and Brooklyn Museum
- Melissa Zink: artist and sculptor
- Jessie Van Zile Belden, author

== Campus ==
Emma Willard's 137-acre (55 ha) campus on Mount Ida, above the city of Troy, contains 30 buildings. The three oldest buildings, all of collegiate Gothic style, include a cathedral-like reading room, classrooms, offices, a main auditorium, a dance studio, a lab theater, three residence halls, dining facility, a student center, and a chapel. The buildings were designed by the Olmstead Brothers.

A modern art, music, and library complex opened in 1967. The library holds more than 34,000 volumes and 77 print and online periodical subscriptions.

Athletic facilities include a gymnasium with two basketball/volleyball/ indoor tennis courts, full facilities for fitness training and aerobic dance, a weight room, an aquatics center housing a competition-size pool, three large playing fields, and an all-weather track.

The three-story Hunter Science Center houses laboratories and teaching facilities for chemistry, biology, physics, and mathematics. Approximately 75 percent of the faculty reside on campus in houses and apartments.

There are two main dormitory halls, Kellas and Sage. There are 10 residential faculty members. Students may also live in Cluett House, a "residential experience for students who are interested in creating positive world change".

The school was used as a filming location for the films The Emperor's Club (as St. Benedict's Academy) and Scent of a Woman (as Baird School). In both films, the school is portrayed as an all-boys school, and becomes co-ed in the later-years section of The Emperor's Club. It is also the setting in the novel City of Girls by Elizabeth Gilbert.

In 2024, Architectural Digest named the school one of the "World's 9 Most Beautiful Boarding Schools."

== Athletics ==
Emma Willard has thirteen interscholastic sports teams: badminton, field hockey, soccer, volleyball, tennis, cross country, swimming, diving, basketball, lacrosse, softball, crew, and track (indoor and outdoor). In 2019, there were 29 athletic coaches and affiliated personnel at Emma Willard.

Facilities include an aerobics studio, pool, weight room, two athletics fields, an all-weather track, seven tennis courts, two pickleball courts, and woodlands with paths for biking or running.

== Affiliations ==
Emma Willard School is a member of the International Coalition of Girls' Schools, The Association of Boarding Schools (TABS), the New York State Association of Independent Schools, and the National Association of Independent Schools.

== Sexual abuse ==
In April 2017, Emma Willard released a comprehensive report on sexual misconduct by faculty members that spanned almost seven decades. As a result, the school established the "Healthy Boundaries Initiatives" to address the prevention of and response to sexual misconduct and abuse. Changes and revisions were made to policies, procedures, and programming, and the school stated its commitment to safety on campus and within the community.

== See also ==
- Emma Willard, the school's founder and namesake
- Female seminaries
- Women in education in the United States

== General and cited references ==
- Scott, Anne Firor. "What, Then, Is the American: This New Woman?" The Journal of American History. Vol. 65, no. 3 (December 1978): 679–703. doi:10.2307/1901418. JSTOR 1901418.
- Scott, Anne Firor. "The Ever Widening Circle: The Diffusion of Feminist Values from the Troy Female Seminary, 1822–1872". History of Education Quarterly Vol. 19, no. 1 (Spring 1979): 3–25. doi:10.2307/367807. JSTOR 367807.
- Woody, Thomas. A History of Women's Education in the United States (registration required). New York: Octagon Books, 1929.
