= Washington, Maryland =

Washington, Maryland may refer to:

- Washington County, Maryland, United States
- Washington metropolitan area, comprising all of Washington, D.C. and parts of Maryland, Virginia, and West Virginia

== See also ==
- Fort Washington, Maryland
- Washington College, Maryland
