= Ruth Pine Furniss =

American poet

Ruth Pine Furniss (1893–1957) was an American writer who published several short stories and novels.

== Biography ==
Ruth Kellogg Pine Furniss was born on March 2, 1893, to Charles LeRoy and Grace Eddy Kellogg Pine in Lansingburg, New York. She attended the Emma Willard School (Troy, New York) and Miss Porter's School (Farmington, Connecticut). She studied short story writing with Blanche Colton Williams at Columbia University and went on to publish a number of short stories and novels. In 1937, with the poet Weldon Kees, Furniss adapted her short story "Obsession" into a one-act play with the same title.

It is believed Furniss suffered from bipolar disorder, which was treated with periods of institutionalization, shock-therapy, a topectomy, and ultimately, a lobotomy. Furniss's writings drew on her struggle with illness and her exposure to various medical treatments, as can be seen in her novels Gay (1928), Snow: A Love Story (1929), and The Dreamland Tree (an unpublished novel completed in 1952 after Furniss received a topectomy and shock therapy). Furniss published The Layman Looks at Doctors (1929) under the pseudonyms S.W. and J.T. Pierce, who were a fictional couple.

In 1912, Furniss married Henry Dawson Furniss (d. 1942), with whom she had five children, three of whom survived childhood (Henry Dawson, James P., and W. Todd). The Furniss family lived in Pelham, New York, and in New York City. During World War II Furniss served as a Gray Lady with the Red Cross. Furniss was hospitalized at several points during her life, including periods at Pilgrim Psychiatric Center and Central Islip Psychiatric Center (Long Island). Furniss died of a heart attack in December 1957, at the age of 64.

== Bibliography ==
=== Novels ===
- Gay. New York: Harcourt, Brace and Co., 1928.
- Snow: A Love Story. New York: Harcourt, Brace and Co., 1929.
- The Layman Looks at Doctors. New York: Harcourt, Brace and Co., 1929.
- The Dreamland Tree. Unpublished.

=== Short stories ===
- "Sentence." Charm (December 1924).
- "Only Once." The New Eve (April 1926).
- "Relax." Chicago Sunday Tribune (May 9, 1926).
- "Clay." Transition (August 1927).
- "Bess Does Her Best." Chicago Sunday Tribune (November 27, 1927).
- "Answer." Transition (September 1929). Reprinted in The Best Short Stories of 1930 edited by Edward J. O'Brien (New York: Dodd, Mead and Company, 1930).
- "Triangle." Harper's Bazaar (July 1930)
- "Obsession." Story (February 1934).

=== Articles ===
- "Notes on Apprenticeship." The Editor, Vol. 73, No. 9 (1926).
- "The Second Shall Be First." The Editor, Vol. 82, No. 11 (1928).

=== Archive ===
- Ruth Pine Furniss Papers. Yale Collection of American Literature, Beinecke Rare Book and Manuscript Library.
