= Pacific Forest Trust =

US non-profit conservation land trust

Pacific Forest Trust is an accredited non-profit conservation land trust that advances forest conservation and stewardship solutions. Its mission is to sustain America's forests for their public benefits of wood, water, wildlife, and people's wellbeing, in cooperation with landowners and communities.

== History ==
Pacific Forest Trust was founded in 1993 by Laurie Wayburn and Constance Best to provide incentives and support to encourage and enable forest landowners to conserve their properties. Laurie Wayburn, an environmentalist and Harvard Alumna, is the daughter of noted environmentalist Edgar Wayburn. Constance Best is a conservationist and entrepreneur.

== Approach ==
The Trust's strategy is to make conservation an economically competitive use of forests and other associated lands. They partner with private landowners to permanently conserve their forests, prioritizing long-term forest health and productivity that benefit the public, with 82,484 acres currently under conservation easement. They promote forest conservation because it helps mitigate climate change, protects water resources, serves as habitat for wildlife, and offers recreational opportunities for those who enjoy the outdoors.

Pacific Forest Trust promotes practical implementation of stewardship forestry—forestry, which encourages natural, native forest composition, age distributions, processes, and structures—on private forestlands. They do this through providing research results, technical and management planning assistance, demonstration, advice and education for landowners, resource managers, and governmental agency personnel. Pacific Forest Trust's Van Eck Forest Project is an example of this type of forestry. This project was also the first emissions reduction project registered and independently verified in California.

== Policy and advocacy ==
The Trust develops policy initiatives and analyses to generate new incentives for—or remove barriers to—long-term forest stewardship, promoting initiatives and regulations that support landowners' investments in the restoration and conservation of their land. They pioneered the conception and implementation of the Working Forest Conservation Easement, which is a conservation easement "specifically designed to protect working forests in which the harvesting of timber and other forest products is sustained in perpetuity along with related conservation values" such as wildlife habitat, water sources, and climate-mitigating stores of carbon.

Pacific Forest Trust also led the process of including legitimate and verifiable standards for forest carbon into the Global Warming Solutions Act of 2006 and participated in the development of the Forest Project Protocol. By doing so they created the basis for the ongoing market in forestry-based Carbon Credits that has been facilitating the reduction of net emissions of CO_{2} since it was enacted.

In addition, the Trust developed a streamlined approach to obtaining Safe Harbor Agreements, that ensure landowners are rewarded—rather than penalized—for maximizing conservation of habitat for animals that are in danger of extinction.

In 2004, Pacific Forest Trust also spearheaded an attempt to add nearly 1,600 acres to the Yosemite National Park by purchasing 793 acres of the land and then offering it to the National Park for inclusion. The local Congressman Tom McClintock halted the attempt.

== Awards and accolades ==
- Pacific Forest Trust was awarded the California Climate Action Reserve's "Climate Action Champion" Award in 2012.
- In 2010 and 2016, Pacific Forest Trust achieved "accredited" status and renewed their accreditation respectively through the Land Trust Accreditation Commission, an independent program of the Land Trust Alliance.
- In 2009, Pacific Forest Trust was awarded the U.S. EPA International Climate Protection Award, the EPA's highest honor in climate protection.

== Reactions ==
Some environmental groups opposed the rules that authorized the production of Carbon Credits from forestland, including the Sierra Club, the Center for Biological Diversity and two dozen others. It is still controversial.
