= Stephen G. Kurtz =

11th Principal of Phillips Exeter Academy
- In office 1974–1987
- Preceded by: Richard Ward Day
- Succeeded by: Kendra Stearns O'Donnell

Personal details
- Born: September 9, 1926 Buffalo, New York, U.S.
- Died: January 24, 2008 (aged 81) Washington, D.C., U.S.
- Education: Princeton University (A.B.); University of Pennsylvania (Ph.D.)

Stephen Guild Kurtz (September 9, 1926 – January 24, 2008) was an American academic and educator, who served as the eleventh principal of Phillips Exeter Academy.

== Background and career ==
Kurtz was born on September 9, 1926, in Buffalo, New York. He graduated with an A.B. in history from Princeton University in 1948 after completing a senior thesis titled "Humanist Ideals of Education in the Renaissance." While an undergraduate student at Princeton, Kurtz was a member of the Princeton Nassoons and the president of the Princeton University Glee Club. He later received a Ph.D. in history from the University of Pennsylvania in 1953 after completing a doctoral dissertation titled "American Politics, 1795-1800." In 1961, he was awarded the Guggenheim Fellowship for the field of study of U.S. history.

He served a teaching post as a history teacher at Athens College, in Greece and posts at Wabash College and Hamilton College. He was principal of Phillips Exeter Academy between 1974 and 1987. In 1981, he received an honorary degree from Princeton. In 1999 he was the acting president of Athens College.

Additionally, Kurtz served on the faculties of the College of William & Mary, Columbia University and American University. He was a member of the Omohundro Institute of Early American History and Culture.

Kurtz married Katherine Jeanne Godolphin at Princeton University Chapel in September 1947; they had a daughter and two sons.

Kurtz died January 24, 2008, in Washington, D.C.

== Published works ==
- "Essays on the American Revolution", University of North Carolina Press (June 1973).
- "The Federalists-Creators and Critics of the Union, 1780-1801", John Wiley & Sons (January 1972).
- "The Presidency of John Adams: The collapse of Federalism, 1795-1800", University of Pennsylvania Press (1957).
