= Elizabeth Cody Kimmel =

American children's book writer (born 1964)

- Born: October 23, 1964 (age 62); New York City, New York, U.S.
- Education: Emma Willard School; Kenyon College
- Occupation: Writer

Elizabeth Cody Kimmel (born 23 October 1964) is an American children's book writer. She is the author of more than forty books ranging from picture books through middle grade and young adult. Both her fiction and non-fiction work often incorporates subjects of personal interest or study, such as history, Tibetan Buddhism, the supernatural, and polar exploration. Kimmel has also published under the names Elizabeth Kimmel Willard, E.C. Kimmel, and Elizabeth Cody.

== Early life and education ==
Kimmel was born in New York City. She grew up in Westchester County, New York and Brussels, Belgium. While in New York, she attended Emma Willard School, graduating in 1982. She graduated from Kenyon College, Gambier, Ohio, in 1986.

== Writing career ==
Kimmel's first published book was In the Stone Circle, a historical mystery set in Wales. This book won the Minnesota Youth Reading Award.

In 1999 she published the non-fiction Ice Story:Shackleton's Lost Expedition, about the doomed 1914 Imperial Trans-Antarctic Expedition. The Society of Children's Book Writers and Illustrators named it a Golden Kite Honor Book.

Over the next several years Kimmel published a factually based historical fiction series about the childhood of Buffalo Bill Cody, to whom she is related. In 2003, book 3 of that series, In the Eye of the Storm: The Adventures of Young Buffalo Bill won the Western Writers of America Spur Award.

In 2005 she wrote the first of three middle-grade novels in the perennially popular "Lily B." series.

In 2006 National Geographic Books published Kimmel's non-fiction book Ladies First: 40 Daring Women Who Were Second to None, which was listed on CBC's lists of Notable Trade Books in Social Studies, and chosen as a KidsPost Book of the Week by the Washington Post.

Her 2007 picture book The Top Job was reviewed on the American Library Association's website, Booklistonline, and Bank Street College included it their Best Children's Book of the Year list. It was also adapted into a musical by the Vital Music Company in New York City, and was included on Tennessee's Volunteer State Book Master List.

In 2008, Kimmel wrote the first book in her "Suddenly Supernatural" series. The series has been translated into five languages. School Spirit, the first book in the series, was a Scholastic Book Club title and was on the New York Public Library's 100 Titles for Reading and Sharing. That year Kimmel was also a recipient of the Alice Curtis Desmond Award.

Kimmel's 2009 biography of the Dalai Lama, Boy on the Lion Throne was included on Bank Street's 2010 list of 100 Top Books. The book includes a preface written by the Dalai Lama especially for the book.

In 2012, she published the first book in her series "Forever Four", followed by "Legend of the Ghost Dog", which was a Scholastic Book Club and Bookfair main selection. Kimmel also collaborated with Laika Studios to create novelizations of films, most recently The Boxtrolls in 2014.

Kimmel lives in upstate New York, and continues to write and edit books. She is also an editorial advisor for the publishing company Walker Books, and is on the Board of Directors of Tibet Aid, has worked as a project editor and literary consult for Oxford University Press and Benchmark Education, and an editorial consultant and writer for One Hundred Robots, Inc. She is also a staff ghostwriter and editor at Kevin Anderson & Associates.

== Books ==
- In the Stone Circle (1998)
- Ice Story: Shackleton’s Lost Expedition (1999)
- Balto and the Great Race (1999)
- Visiting Miss Caples (2000)
- My Wagon Will Take Me Anywhere (2002)
- To the Frontier: The Adventures of Young Buffalo Bill (2002)
- One Sky Above Us: The Adventures of Young Buffalo Bill (2002)
- In the Eye of the Storm: The Adventures of Young Buffalo Bill (2003)
- West on the Wagon Train: The Adventures of Young Buffalo Bill (2003)
- As Far as the Eye Can Reach: Lewis and Clark’s Westward Quest (2003)
- What Do You Dream? (2003)
- Lily B. on the Brink of Cool (2003)
- Before Columbus: The Leif Eriksson Expedition (2004)
- The Look-It-Up Book of Explorers (2004)
- My Penguin Osbert (2004)
- Lily B. on the Brink of Love (2005)
- Ladies First: 40 Daring American Women Who Were Second to None (2006)
- Lily B. on the Brink of Paris (2006)
- Dinosaur Bone War: Cope and Marsh’s Fossil Feud (2006)
- The Top Job (2007)
- Mary Ingalls On Her Own (2008)
- Spin the Bottle (2008)
- Glamsters (2008)
- Suddenly Supernatural Book 1: School Spirit (2008)
- My Penguin Osbert in Love (2009)
- Suddenly Supernatural Book 2: Scaredy Kat (2009)
- Suddenly Supernatural Book 3: Unhappy Medium (2009)
- Boy on the Lion Throne: The Childhood of the 14th Dalai Lama (2009)
- Suddenly Supernatural Book 4: Crossing Over (2010)
- The Reinvention of Moxie Roosevelt (2010)
- Forever Four (Forever Four #1) (2012)
- Leading Ladies (Forever Four #2) (2012)
- Stories From New York (Forever Four #3) (2012)
- Staying in Tune (Forever Four #4) (2012)
- ParaNorman: A Novel (2012)
- Legend of the Ghost Dog (2012)
- The Secret of the Mountain Dog (2014)
- A Taste of Freedom: Gandhi and the Great Salt March (2014)
- The BoxTrolls (2014)
- The Jazzman's Trumpet (2015)
