= Jean Buttner =

American businesswoman

Jean Buttner was the Chairman of the Board, President, CEO, and COO of Value Line, Inc. and Arnold Bernhard & Co., Inc. Buttner had held these positions since 1986. She was forced to step down and relinquish all executive titles with Value Line and its family of mutual funds by the Securities and Exchange Commission on November 4, 2009 as part of a settlement to avoid litigation.

She also serves as a Trustee of Skidmore College. Buttner studied at Emma Willard School.
