= Constance Rosenblum =

American newspaper editor, biographer, and author

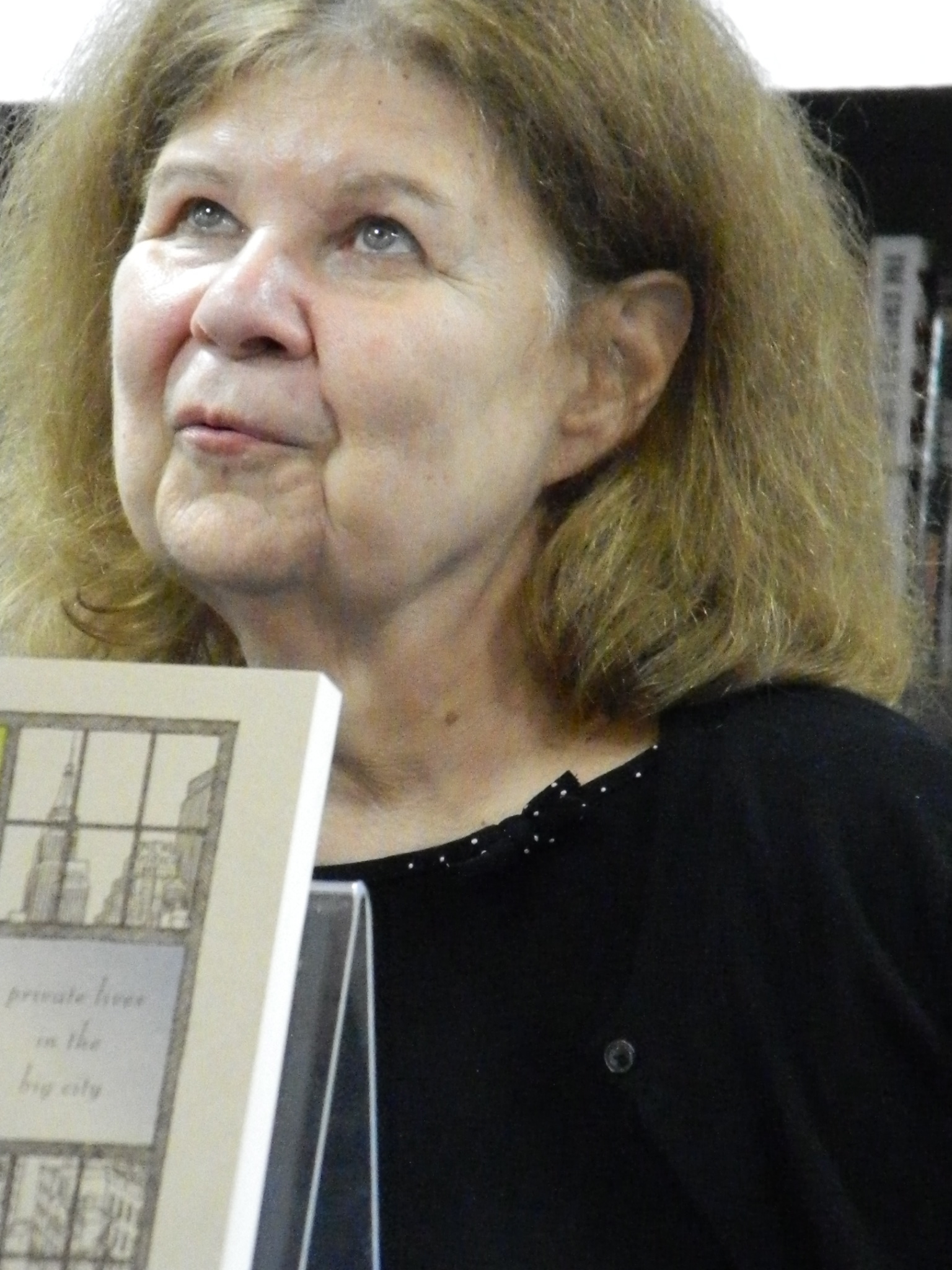
- Rosenblum at New York Barnes & Noble, 2013
- Occupations: Newspaper editor, biographer, author

Constance Rosenblum is an American newspaper editor, biographer, and author.

== Biography ==
Rosenblum grew up in Middletown, New York, and graduated from Emma Willard School and Bryn Mawr College.

Her books include Gold Digger: The Outrageous Life and Times of Peggy Hopkins Joyce, which was named an editor's choice by The New Yorker, and Boulevard of Dreams, a history of the Grand Concourse. She is the editor of The New York Times' City section. She was the editor of the paper's Arts and Leisure section from 1990 to 1997.
