= Jessie Van Zile Belden =

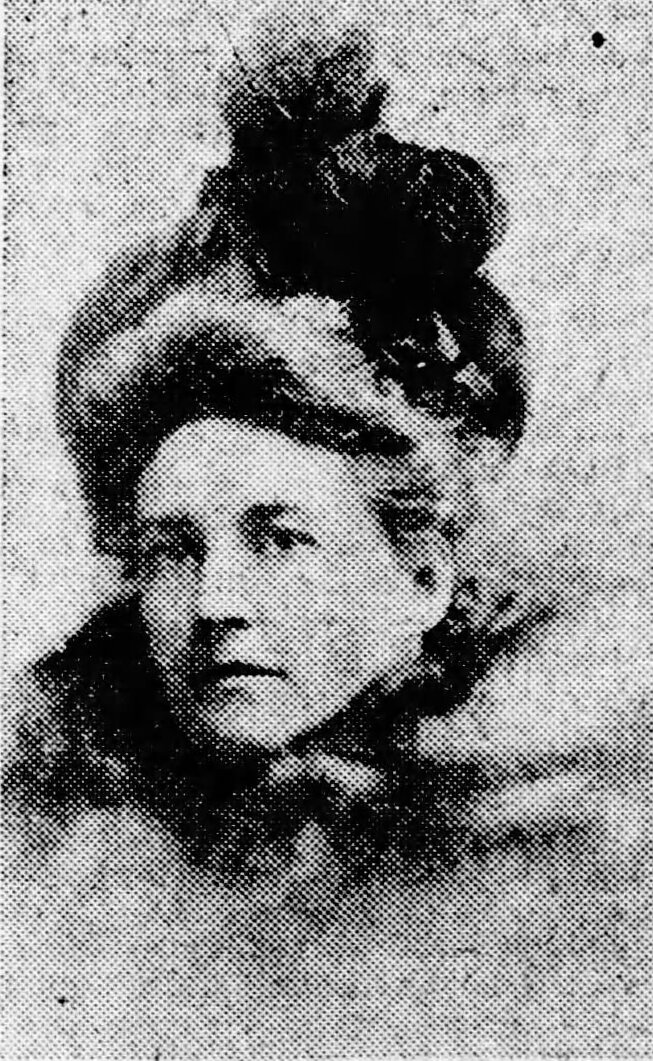

New York State Regent of the Daughters of the American Revolution

Personal details
- Born: Jessie Perry Van Zile; November 13, 1857 Troy, New York, U.S.
- Died: February 2, 1910 (aged 52) New York City, New York, U.S.
- Spouse: James Mead Belden
- Children: 5
- Education: Troy Female Seminary; St. Agnes School
- Occupation: writer

Jessie Perry Van Zile Belden (November 13, 1857 – February 2, 1910) was an American novelist.

== Early life and education ==
Jessie Perry Van Zile Belden was born on November 13, 1857 in Troy, New York, the daughter of Oscar E. Van Zile and Sarah Perry Van Zile. She was educated at the Troy Female Seminary and St. Agnes School in Albany, New York.

== Career ==
Her writing career began with a poem published in Life in 1890. Her first novel was a society novel, Fate at the Door (1895). She also wrote two historical novels: The King's Ward (1898), set in France, and Antonia (1901), set in Holland and New Amsterdam. Her short stories include "Not on the Passenger List," which appeared in Harper's in July 1899.

== Personal life ==
On October 24, 1878, she married James Mead Belden. They had five sons, Mead Van Zile, James Jerome II, Augustus Cadwell, Perry, and Oscar Van Zile.

She served as the State Regent of the New York Society of the Daughters of the American Revolution.

== Bibliography ==
- Fate at the Door. Philadelphia: J. B. Lippincott, 1895
- Concerning the Ancestors and Descendants of Royal Denison Belden and Olive Cadwell Belden, 1898
- The King's Ward, 1898
- Antonia. Boston: L. C. Page and London: J. Murray, 1901.
