= Reisha Raney =

American business executive and engineer

- Education: Spelman College (BS); Georgia Tech (BSE)
- Occupations: business executive, podcaster
- Spouse: Julian Doe (m. 2024)
- Website: Official website

Reisha L. Raney is an American business executive and podcaster. In 2018, she became the first black woman to serve as a Maryland state officer in the National Society Daughters of the American Revolution. She previously served as the national vice chairwoman of the society's membership committee division. Raney is the founder and CEO of Encyde Corporation and the founder of Daughter Dialogues, a podcast documenting the narratives of black members of the Daughters of the American Revolution.

== Early life and education ==
Raney grew up in Prince George's County, Maryland.

She graduated from Georgia Tech with a bachelor's degree in mechanical engineering. She also has a bachelor's degree in mathematics from Spelman College. She is a non-resident fellow at Harvard University's W.E.B. Du Bois Research Institute for African and African American Studies at the Hutchins Center for African and African American Research.

== Career ==
Raney served as the director of internet protocol solutions for Concert, a joint venture of AT&T and BT, working in New York, Hong Kong, Singapore, Japan, and in London. She became a data networking account executive and was ranked in the top two of the company's salespeople in the United States.

In 2001, Raney founded Encyde Corporation.

=== DAR and podcast ===
As a relative of President Thomas Jefferson, Raney joined the Daughters of the American Revolution in 2010. She is a descendant of Edwin Turpin, a cousin of Jefferson, and an enslaved woman named Mary, whom Turpon took to Canada to marry. Turpin's home in Goochland County, Virginia was burned down as a result of this union, and in his will he freed his enslaved children. Raney's father was a member of the Sons of the American Revolution.

Raney served as regent of a local DAR chapter in Fort Washington, Maryland. In 2018, Raney was elected the Maryland state society's organizing secretary. She was the first black woman to serve as a Maryland state officer of the Daughters of the American Revolution and was inducted in a ceremony in Baltimore. She previously served on the national level of the organization as the vice chairwoman of the membership committee division. Raney founded Daughter Dialogues, a podcast documenting the narratives of black members of the DAR, which launched on July 1, 2021.

== Personal life ==
In 2023, Raney married Julian Doe at Oxon Hill Manor in Oxon Hill, Maryland.
