= Alex Bernstein (American football) =

American football player (born 1975)

No. 75, 67, 76, 66
- Position: Offensive lineman

Personal information
- Born: August 11, 1975 (age 51); Royal Oak, Michigan, U.S.
- Listed height: 6 ft 3 in (1.91 m)
- Listed weight: 325 lb (147 kg)

Career information
- High school: Blake (Hopkins, Minnesota)
- College: Colby, Amherst

Career history
- Baltimore Ravens (1997); New York Jets (1998); Cleveland Browns (1999); Atlanta Falcons (2000)

Awards and highlights
- NCAA Division III All-American (1996); NESCAC Defensive Player of the Year (1996)

Alexander Douglas Bernstein (born August 11, 1975) is an American former football offensive lineman who played for the Baltimore Ravens, New York Jets, Cleveland Browns, and Atlanta Falcons of the National Football League (NFL). He is also an entrepreneur who co-founded both North Venture Partners and North Social. Inc. Magazine named Bernstein one of the most successful NFL players turned entrepreneur.

== Early life and college ==
Bernstein is Jewish. He played high school football at The Blake School in Hopkins, Minnesota. where he competed in the Tri-Metro Conference. After graduating, he played NCAA Division III college football at Colby College in Waterville, Maine in 1993. In 1994, Bernstein transferred to Amherst College in Amherst, Massachusetts, where he played three seasons of football. As a senior, he was named USA Division III Senior All-Star, New England Small College Athletic Conference (NESCAC) Defensive Player of the Year, All ECAC First Team, New England Football Writers All-New England, Gridiron Club Division II/III Defensive Player of the Year, and AFCA Division III Coaches First Team All-American. In his senior season in 1996, the Amherst College defense led the nation with the fewest points allowed per game (8.4).

== Professional career ==
Bernstein became only the fifth NFL player from Amherst when he signed by the Baltimore Ravens as an undrafted free agent following the 1997 NFL draft. In 1997, he changed positions from defensive tackle to offensive guard. During his four-year NFL career he was a reserve offensive lineman for the Baltimore Ravens, New York Jets, Cleveland Browns, and Atlanta Falcons. In 2000, he suffered a career ending injury and was placed on injured reserve by the Atlanta Falcons.

== Business career ==
Bernstein began working in software and technology in 2001. In 2003, he co-founded and was executive vice president of Echo Networks, Inc., a digital media company funded by large retailers including Best Buy and Virgin. In 2004, Bernstein served as senior vice president for Virgin Digital, a US based subsidiary of Richard Branson's Virgin Group, Ltd. In 2006, Bernstein co-founded North Venture Partners, an Oakland, California-based business incubator. In 2009, Bernstein partnered with Jim Kovach, Huntington Willard, and Pete Koch to found Athleticode, a genetic testing company based in Oakland, California. That same year, Bernstein completed the executive education program on entrepreneurship at Harvard Business School. In 2010, he served as interim president for Athleticode, a genetic testing company based in Oakland, California. That same year, Bernstein co-founded North Social, a marketing software company which was acquired by Vocus, Inc. in February 2011. In 2012, Bernstein received the Technology Award from the Oakland Digital Arts and Literacy Center. In 2012, Bernstein was listed as one of the most successful professional athlete entrepreneurs by Inc. Magazine, CNBC, and The Huffington Post.

== Personal life ==
Alex Bernstein married Patricia Haupt in June 2000. Bernstein resides in the San Francisco Bay Area. Bernstein has served as a vice president for the NFL Retired Players Association of Northern California.
