= Kendra Stearns O'Donnell =

American educator and painter

12th Principal of Phillips Exeter Academy
- In office 1987–1997
- Preceded by: Stephen Guild Kurtz
- Succeeded by: Tyler Chapman Tingley

Personal details
- Education: Barnard College (BA); Columbia University (PhD)

Kendra Stearns O'Donnell (born 1944) is an American educator and painter who served as the 12th principal of Phillips Exeter Academy.

== Biography ==
She attended Emma Willard School, graduating in 1960, Barnard College, graduating in 1965, and Columbia University, where she received an M.A. and Ph.D. degree in English. As an assistant professor of English at Princeton University, entering the faculty in 1971, she received, as the first woman to do so, the title of university marshal. She served as a program officer at the Markle Foundation, the program director of the Arthur Vining Davis Foundations, and as a consultant and special assistant to the president of the Rockefeller Brothers Fund. She became the first female principal of Exeter in 1987, and served until her retirement 1997. During her time at Exeter, she received significant press coverage over her handling of a scandal involving the firing of a drama teacher, Larry Lane Bateman, over child pornography charges in 1992.

She currently serves as a member of the board of trustees at the Hotchkiss School; Emma Willard School, where she served as the president of the board prior to becoming principal of Exeter; and the Currier Museum of Art. Past positions of hers include the director of the New Hampshire Charitable Foundation and the vice-president of the board of the Society for the Protection of New Hampshire Forests.

O'Donnell has three children, two of which are from her first marriage to financier and lawyer James Hamilton, and one of which is from her second marriage to Patrick O'Donnell, a classicist and banker with whom she served on the Princeton faculty. She has received honorary degrees from New England College and Hamilton College.
