= Peggy Wayburn =

- Born: Cornelia Thomas Elliott; September 2, 1917; New York City
- Died: March 21, 2002 (aged 84); San Francisco
- Spouses: John W. Haslett (m. 1939) Edgar Arthur Wayburn (m. 1947)
- Children: 3 daughters, 1 son

Cornelia Elliott "Peggy" Wayburn (September 2, 1917 – March 21, 2002) was an American author, conservationist, and photographer.

== Personal life ==
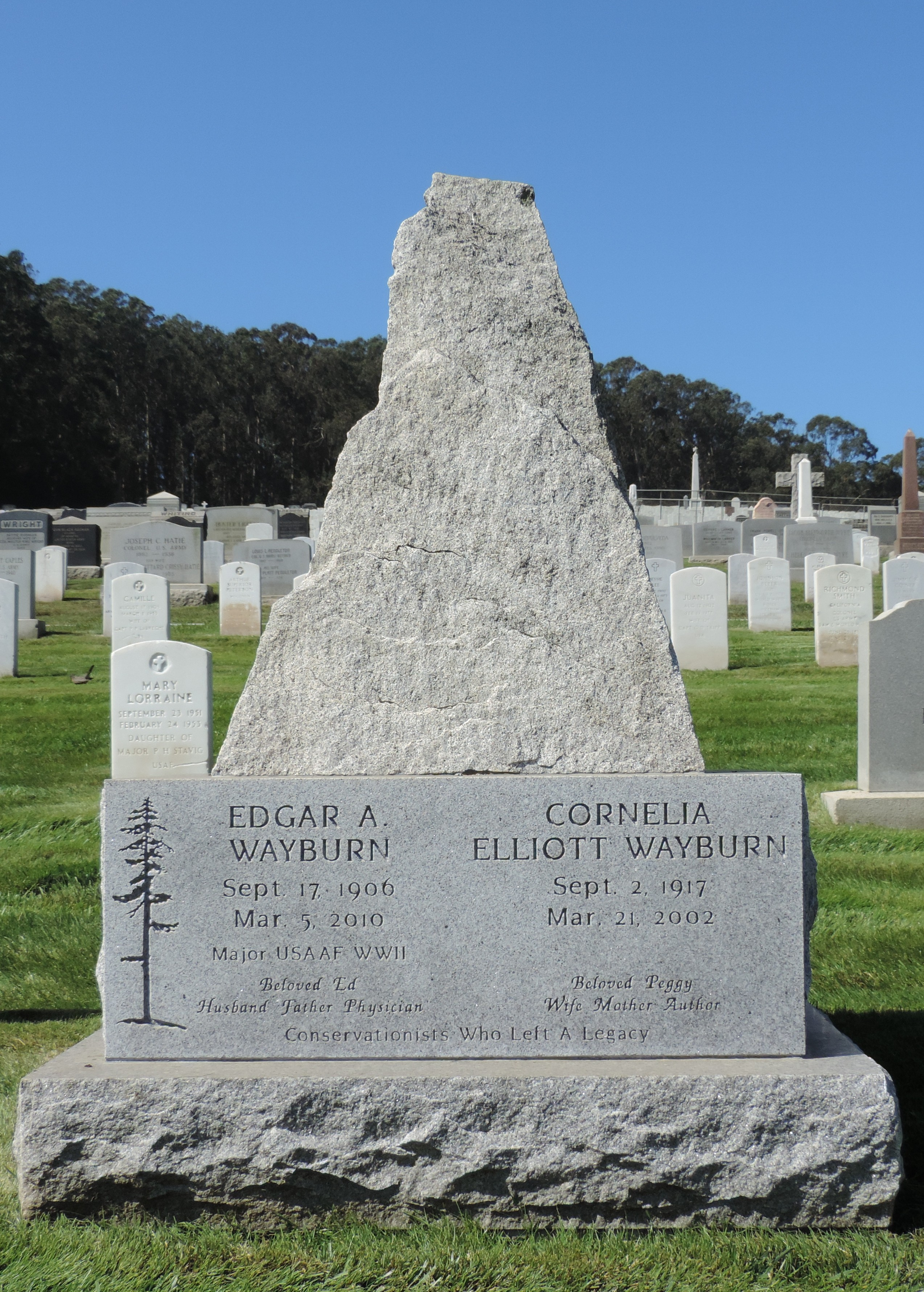

She was born Cornelia Thomas Elliott on September 2, 1917, in New York City to Thomas Ketchin Elliott, Jr. and Cornelia Ligon Elliott. Elliott is a direct descendent Henry Laurens Elliott, a South Carolina banker and slaveholding member of the Planter class. She graduated from Emma Willard School. On September 23, 1939, she married John W. Haslett, changing her name to Cornelia Elliott Haslett. In 1942, she graduated Phi Beta Kappa from Barnard College. In 1945, she moved to San Francisco to work as a copywriter for J. Walter Thompson. In 1946, she met Edgar Arthur Wayburn. Cornelia and Edgar went hiking on Mount Tamalpais for their first date, and they married less than six months later on September 12, 1947.

She died on March 21, 2002, in San Francisco after having an abdominal disease for more than three years. She was survived by three daughters, Diana Wayburn, Cynthia Wayburn, and Laurie Wayburn; one son, William Wayburn; and three grandchildren.

== Bibliography ==
- Wayburn, Peggy (1972). Edge of life; the world of the estuary. Sierra Club Books. ISBN 0-87156-057-7.
- Miller, Mike; Wayburn, Peggy (1974). Alaska, the Great Land. Sierra Club Books. ISBN 0-87156-110-7.
- Wayburn, Peggy (1978). "The Redwoods: Jobs and Environment". Environment: Science and Policy for Sustainable Development. 20 (3): 34–39. Bibcode:1978ESPSD..20c..34W. doi:10.1080/00139157.1978.9933060.
- Wayburn, Peggy (1982). Adventuring in Alaska. Sierra Club Books. ISBN 0-87156-299-5.
- Wayburn, Peggy (1983). "Legal Hassles over the West's Natural Heritage". Ambio: A Journal of the Human Environment. 12 (5): 274. JSTOR 4312939.
- Wayburn, Peggy (1984). "Alaska: the Great Experiment". Ambio: A Journal of the Human Environment. 13 (4): 248–252. JSTOR 4313035.
- Wayburn, Peggy (1987). Adventuring in the San Francisco Bay Area. Sierra Club Books. ISBN 0-87156-711-3.
