= The Blake School (Minneapolis) =

Prep school in Hopkins, Minnesota, US

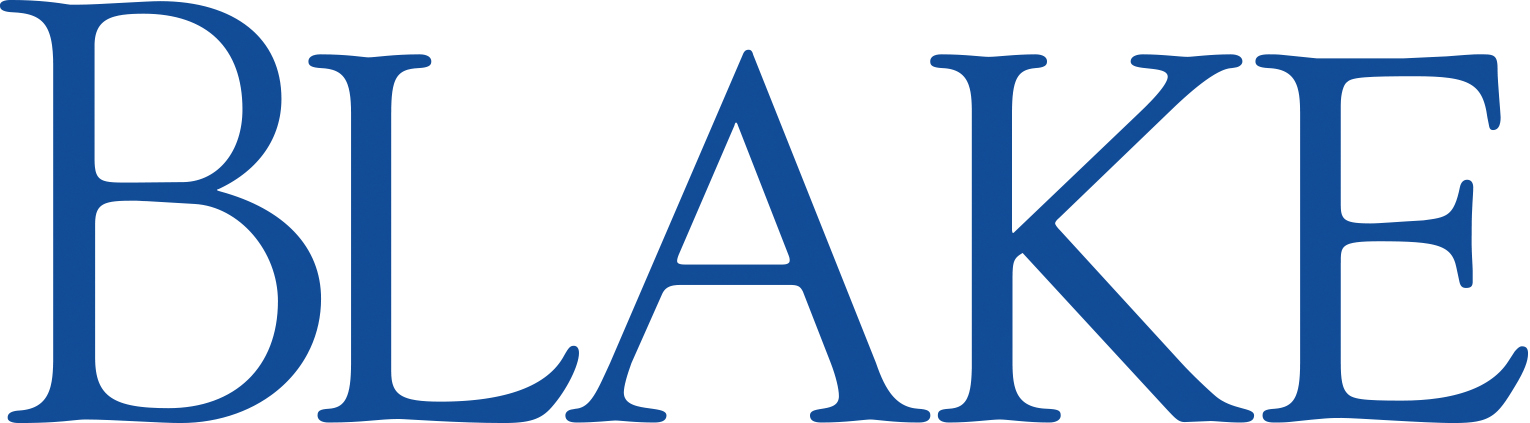

Information
- Type: Private, College-prep, Day
- Established: 1900
- Head of school: Chris Torino
- Faculty: 350
- Grades: PK–12
- Gender: Coeducational
- Enrollment: Approx. 1,330
- Average class size: 15–16
- Student to teacher ratio: 9:1
- Campus: Upper School, The Northrop Campus (Minneapolis); Middle and Lower School, The Blake Campus (Hopkins, Minnesota)
- Colors: blue, green, brown, and white
- Athletics conference: Independent Metro Athletic Conference (IMAC)
- Mascot: Cyrus the Bear
- Annual tuition: $42,027
- Website: blakeschool.org

The Blake School is a private, coeducational, college-preparatory day school located in Hopkins, Minnesota. The school is located on two campuses in the Twin Cities area: the upper school (9–12) in Minneapolis with the middle and lower school, along with administrative offices, on the Hopkins campus.

Blake, originally an all-boys school, was established by a group of local businessmen in 1907 to prepare students for top colleges in the Northeast. In the 1970s, it merged with its sister school, the Northrop Collegiate School (founded in 1900) and the Highcroft Country Day School (founded in 1958) to become a coeducational institution.

Serving grades pre-kindergarten through 12th, Blake has previously received the National Blue Ribbon School award. In addition, the school is known for its nationally recognized debate program.

== History ==
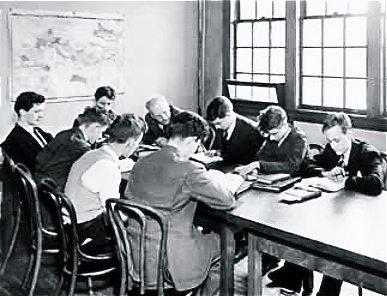
Early Blake boys studying

During the early 20th century, two schools were founded in Minneapolis to prepare students for elite colleges in the Northeast: the Blake School for boys and Northrop Collegiate School for girls. A third school, Highcroft Country Day School serving students of both sexes, was incorporated during the migration to Minneapolis suburbs. In 1974, the three schools merged to become the Blake Schools, with its first coeducational class graduating in 1975.

=== The Blake School ===
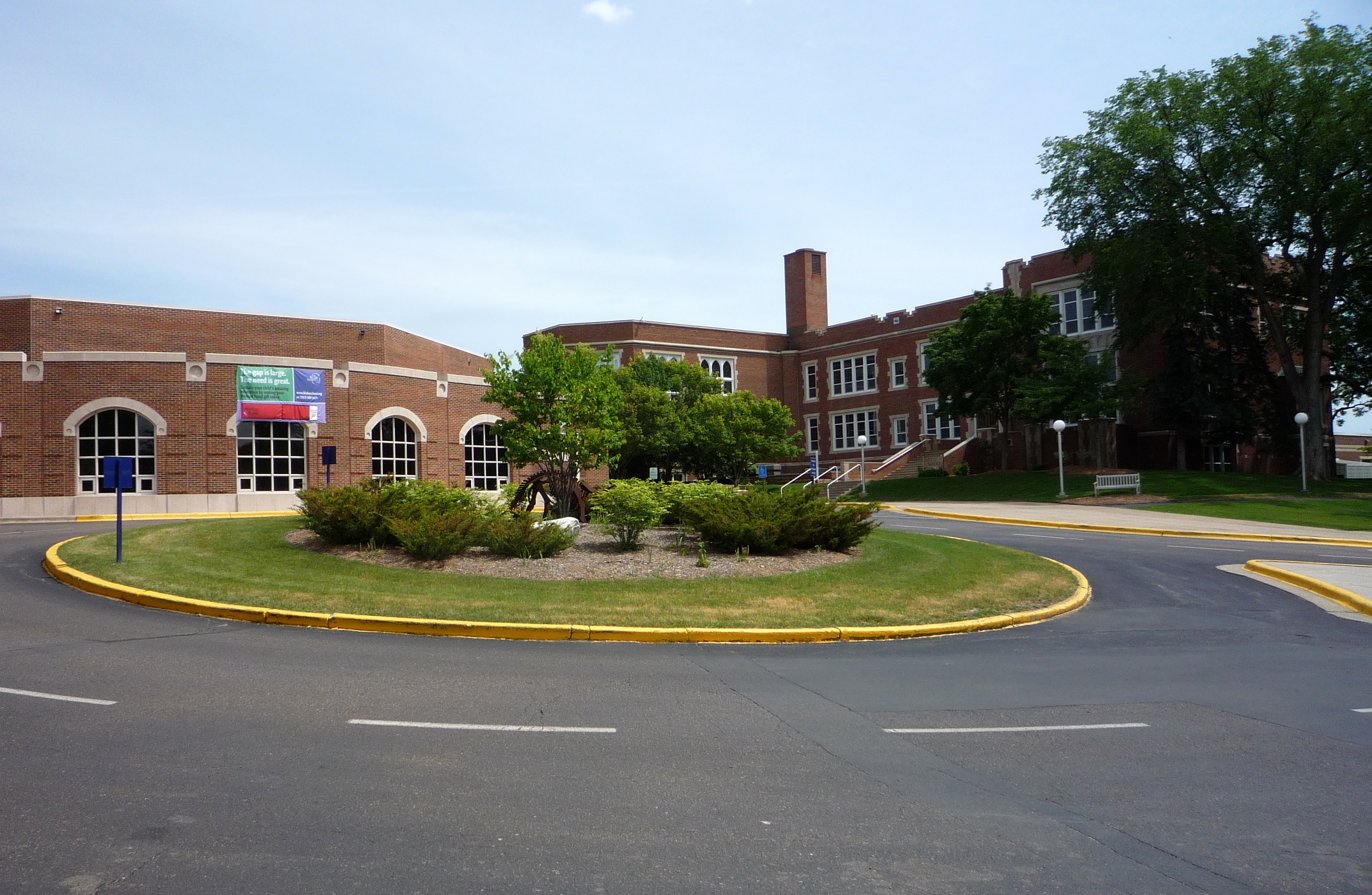
The Blake Campus, home to the Middle School and Lower School, Hopkins

In 1907, William M. Blake established the Blake School, a private, preparatory school for boys, in Minneapolis. Three years later, Charles C. Bovey, a local businessman, wanted to reform Blake, and put it on the same plane as Eastern preparatory schools.

With help from William Blake, new Board of Trustees Chairman Charles Bovey asked sixteen other local business leaders to contribute $2,500 each towards the school's first capital drive. In 1911, these original guarantors hired Charles B. Newton, a Princeton and Harvard alumnus, to replace William Blake as headmaster. Newton envisioned a school "not only for the wealthy, but for the worthy." The school incorporated on May 5, 1911, with all but two guarantors serving on the board of trustees. In 1912, their pooled resources enabled the construction of a new building in suburban Hopkins, with the site, now known as Blake Campus, being the current home of the middle school and lower school.

=== The Northrop Collegiate School ===
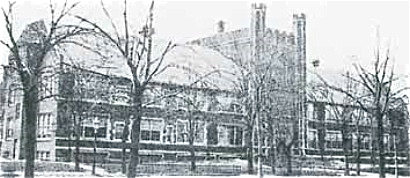
Northrop building in 1916

In 1900, Zulema A. Ruble, a Smith College alumna, and Carrie Bartlett established Graham Hall, a private school for girls, in Minneapolis. In 1914, a group of Minneapolis leaders purchased Graham Hall and incorporated it as Northrop Collegiate School. In 1917, the school relocated within Minneapolis, with the site, now known as Northrop Campus, being the current home of the upper school campus.

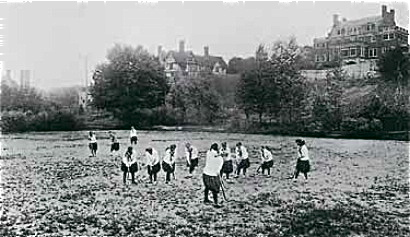
Field hockey on Northrop in 1918

=== The Highcroft Country Day School ===
In 1958, Sage Cowles, wife of John Cowles, Jr., along with two friends, established Highcroft Country Day School, a private, coeducational, nonsectarian K-9 school in Wayzata. Highcroft was designed to provide students in the far western suburbs (at the time) of the Twin Cities with an education near home. In 1960, the school building was constructed on land purchased and donated to the school, part of which was the former Highcroft estate in Wayzata, the site, known as the Highcroft Campus, was home to one of Blake's two lower school buildings until 2023. Now all lower school students attend the Blake campus in Hopkins, Minnesota.

=== Preservation and present ===
In addition to retaining many of the original sites and all original buildings of Blake predecessor institutions, the school also carries on other traditions, such as:

- from the Blake School for the boys – strong speech and debate programs, along with the school color of brown
- from Northrop Collegiate School – strong drama program, mascot of bears, along with the school color of blue
- from Highcroft Country Day School – growing athletic program for both boys and girls, along with school color of green.

Since 2006, all students, faculty, staff, and community volunteers come together annually at the Hopkins campus to celebrate "Convocation Day" and participate in the service-based "Legacy Day". These celebrations highlight new and past traditions, including musical performances from the Middle and Upper School's choir as well as a speech from the current head of school. On Legacy Day, students participate in service-based activities such as packing food, building birdhouses, and making tie blankets for local animal shelters.

The current head of school is Chris Torino. Former Blake Heads of School include Dr. Anne Stavney, John Gulla and Tyler Tingley.

== Academics ==
The school serves approximately 1,400 students in prekindergarten through twelfth grade, with an average classroom size of 15–16 students, and average graduating class size of 130. The school's student-adult ratio is 11:1.

At the high school level, It takes 22 credits to graduate from The Blake School, with a minimum course load of five courses each semester. The Blake School also offers numerous global citizenship programs.

=== Accreditation ===
Blake is accredited by the Independent Schools Association of the Central States (ISACS), and is a member of the National Association of Independent Schools (NAIS), The College Board, National Association of College Admissions Counselors (NACAC), and the Cum Laude Society.

=== Recognition ===
Blake has received numerous accolades in recent years, including:

- U.S. Department of Education – Blue Ribbon School, 1989–90, 1992–93, 1993–94
- The College Board – "Exemplary AP English Literature and Composition Programs", 2007
- Wall Street Journal – "How the Schools Stack Up" (ranking of 41 for high schools with the best record of graduates attending eight top universities), 2007
- Character Education Partnership – National School of Character, 2009
- Mpls St.Paul Magazine – in school diversity and inclusion efforts, 2010
- MN Monthly Magazine – for leadership training of its students, 2012; Built to Lead

In 2011, Blake won the Minnesota Middle School Science Bowl, and was a competing school in the U.S. Department of Energy's National Science Bowl, winning the Hydrogen Fuel Cell Car Race portion. In 2015, it won the Department of Energy's Minnesota High School Science Bowl and proceeded to compete at the national level in Washington D.C.

Blake is also home to one of the most active and successful high school debate programs in the entire country, having won several prestigious national championships, including the National Speech and Debate Association National Tournament, the National Debate Coaches Association National Tournament, and the Tournament of Champions. They are also the first school to qualify debaters to the Tournament of Champions in every event. Every December, Blake hosts the John Edie Debate Tournament, one of the largest regular-season speech and debate tournaments in the country.

== Athletics ==
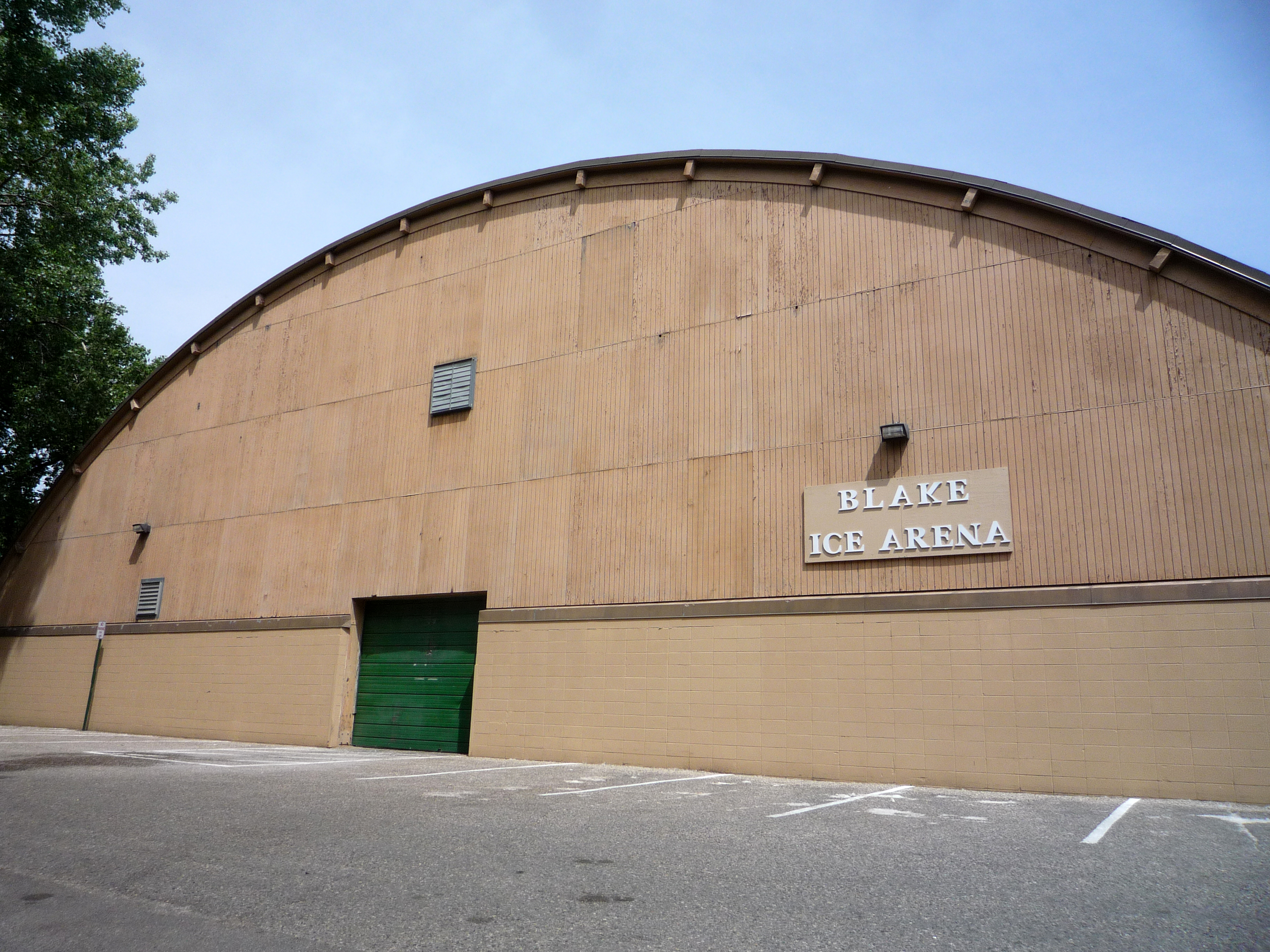
Blake Ice Arena, Blake Campus

Blake competes in the Independent Metro Athletic Conference (IMAC) and formerly in the Tri-Metro Conference, which is part of the Minnesota State High School League. The school athletic teams are named the Blake Bears. The school offers twenty-eight sports, and fields over fifty athletic teams. The school also recognizes club sports, including Ultimate Frisbee, and Sailing. They are also recognized for having their hockey team in a cameo for the 1996 Disney movie D3: The Mighty Ducks when the movie was shot on set at Blake's Hopkins campus hockey arena; they came from behind down 9–0 to tie the Ducks 9-9, with 9 third period goals.

=== History ===
Blake won the Minnesota State High School League Challenge Cup, which awards schools based on their success in section and state fine arts and athletics tournaments, in 2005, 2007, 2009, 2012, 2013, 2014 and 2015 – more than any other school in state history – and was runner-up in 2006, 2008 and 2010, and placed third in 2011. In addition, many Blake alumni go on to play sports at the collegiate level, and some have even been drafted by professional sports franchises in the NHL, NFL, and MLB.

== Notable alumni ==
- Charles Baxter (1965) – author of National Book Award nominated The Feast of Love (2000)
- Alex Bernstein (American football) (1998) - NFL player, entrepreneur, co-founder of North Venture Partners and North Social
- Dani Cameranesi (2013) – Forward for U.S. women's hockey team at 2018 Winter Olympics
- Jack Dalrymple (1966) – former Governor of North Dakota
- Tom Davis (1970) – Emmy-winning comedy writer and performer
- Mark Dayton (1965) – U.S. Senator from Minnesota, 40th Governor of Minnesota, heir to Dayton's and Target Corporation, first husband of Alida Rockefeller Messinger
- David L. Downie (1979) - Scholar of global environmental politics
- David T. Ellwood (1971) – Dean of Harvard John F. Kennedy School of Government
- Al Franken (1969) – U.S. Senator from Minnesota, satirist, comedian, author, screenwriter, Saturday Night Live television performer, political commentator, radio host
- Dave Goldberg (1985) – businessman, CEO of Survey Monkey
- Poppy Harlow (2001) – CNN reporter
- Thomas B. Heffelfinger (1966) – former U.S. Attorney of Minnesota
- George Roy Hill (1939) – Oscar-winning director of Butch Cassidy and the Sundance Kid
- A. J. Jackson (2002) - lead singer of Saint Motel
- Steve Kelley (1971) – Minnesota State Senator, 2000 U.S. Senate candidate, attorney
- Eleanor de Laittre – artist
- Katrina Lake (2001) – CEO of Stitch Fix
- John Hugh MacMillan – businessman
- Whitney MacMillan (1947) – CEO of Cargill
- Marcia McNutt (1970) – president National Academy of Sciences
- Kelly Morrison (1987) - Physician and state representative in the Minnesota House of Representatives
- Kent Patterson (2007) - NHL player
- Marcus Peacock (1978) – former Deputy Administrator U.S. Environmental Protection Agency
- Arthur Phillips (1986) - novelist, screenwriter
- Dean Phillips (1987) - U.S. Representative from Minnesota's 3rd Congressional District (2019–2025), American businessman
- Robert M. Pirsig (1943) - philosopher, author of Zen and the Art of Motorcycle Maintenance: An Inquiry into Values (1974)
- Chan Poling - musician (The Suburbs, The New Standards)
- Jim Warden (1972) - Goaltender for U.S. men's hockey team at 1976 Winter Olympics
- J.T. Wyman (2004) – NHL player
