= Value Line =

Investment research and financial publishing firm based in New York City, New York

Value Line, Inc.
- Company type: Public
- Traded as: Nasdaq: VALU; Russell 2000 Index Component
- Industry: Financial services
- Founded: 1931; 95 years ago
- Founder: Arnold Bernhard
- Headquarters: New York City, New York, United States
- Website: valueline.com

Value Line, Inc. is a publicly traded investment research and financial publishing firm based in New York City. Founded in 1931 by Arnold Bernhard, Value Line is best known for publishing The Value Line Investment Survey, a stock analysis newsletter that tracks approximately 1,700 publicly traded stocks.

== History ==
The "Value Line" was a line representing a multiple of cash flow that Bernhard would visually "fit" or superimpose over a price chart. This was a pioneering attempt to normalize the value of different companies. He soon began publishing his investment survey. Bernhard published The Evaluation of Common Stocks in 1959.

In 1946 Bernhard hired Samuel Eisenstadt as a proofreader, a graduate of Baruch College who majored in statistics. In 1965 Eisenstadt convinced Bernhard to use a statistical method called ordinary least squares (OLS) regression analysis to replace Bernhard's visual method of fitting cash flow to a price chart. Using scores of Monroe mechanical calculators and a handful of data operators, Bernhard and Eisenstadt produced a stock picking system that caught the attention of academic Fischer Black of the University of Chicago. Black published an article in the Financial Analysts Journal, "Yes, Virginia, There Is Hope: Tests of the Value Line Ranking System" in 1973. The system came to be known as the "Value Line Ranking System for Timeliness". With Eisenstadt on board, Bernhard continued to expand the business, adding the other publications and mutual funds along the way. In May 1983, Value Line sold stock to the public for the first time (Nasdaq: VALU), though the Bernhard family retained 80% control.

Bernhard died in December 1987, but until his death, Bernhard continued his literary interests by combining with W. H. Auden, Jacques Barzun and Lionel Trilling in founding the Mid-Century Book Society.

Shortly after his death, his daughter, Jean Buttner, was named CEO of Value Line.

== Fraud case ==
Fraud was uncovered by the Securities and Exchange Commission (SEC) in November 2009. The fraud, which spanned nearly 20 years and involved over $24 million, was committed by Value Line against its mutual fund shareholders. The fraud was first reported to the SEC in 2004 by the then Value Line Fund (Nasdaq: VLIFX) portfolio manager and Chief Quantitative Strategist, John (Jack) Dempsey of Easton, Connecticut, who was required to sign a Code of Business Ethics as required by the Sarbanes-Oxley Act. Restitution totaling $34 million was placed in a fair fund and returned to the affected Value Line mutual fund investors. The Commission ordered Value Line to pay a total of $43,705,765 in disgorgement, prejudgment interest and civil penalty, and ordered CEO Jean Buttner and COO David Henigson to pay civil penalties of $1,000,000 and $250,000, respectively. The Commission further imposed officer and director bars and broker–dealer, investment adviser, and investment company associational bars (“Associational Bars”) against Buttner and Henigson. No criminal charges were filed.

== See also ==
- List of finance topics
- Value Line Composite Index
- Morningstar, Inc.
- American Association of Individual Investors
- Sarbanes–Oxley Act
