= Cynthia Roberts Gorton =

American blind poet and temperance activist (1826–1894)

Cynthia Gorton
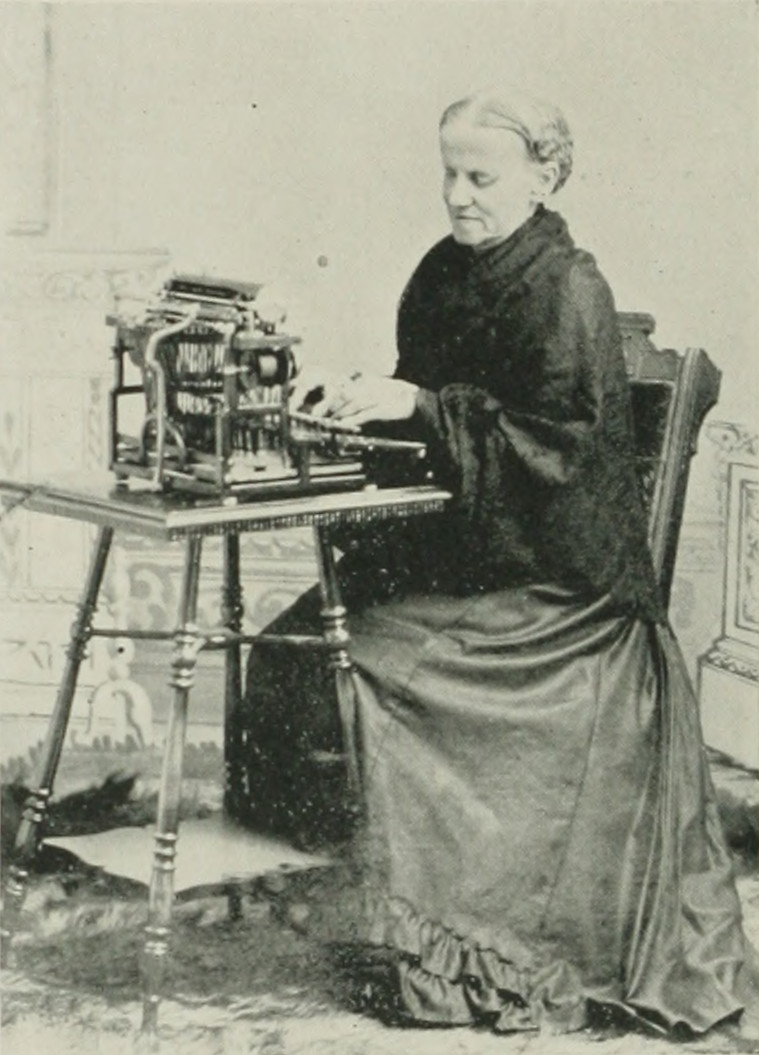
- Photo in A Woman of the Century
- Born: Cynthia M. Roberts; February 27, 1826; Great Barrington, Massachusetts, U.S.
- Died: August 10, 1894 (aged 68); Fenton, Michigan, U.S.
- Resting place: Oakwood Cemetery, Fenton
- Education: Emma Willard School
- Occupations: Poet, author
- Spouse: Fred Gorton
- Writing career
- Pen name: Ida Glenwood
- Language: English

Cynthia Roberts Gorton (née Roberts; pen name, Ida Glenwood; February 27, 1826 - August 10, 1894) was a blind 19th-century American poet and author. She wrote so rapidly, in an unconscious manner, that she formed almost an entire new alphabet. For 20 years, Gorton lectured on behalf of the temperance movement. Gorton was the author of novels, serials, stories, and poems.

== Early life and education ==
Cynthia M. Roberts was born on February 27, 1826, in Great Barrington, Massachusetts. She was the youngest of five children. Her father, Samuel Roberts, died when she was one, leaving the family in poverty.She sometimes lived with friends or family to ease the burden on her widowed mother.

Gorton began writing poetry as a child, and was reportedly reserved and isolated from other children.

Gorton attended the Emma Willard School in Troy, New York. When Gorton was 14 and still a student, her mother died. She was offered the opportunity to continue her studies as a "teacher-scholar," but her eyes, already poor condition, made it too difficult.

== Career ==
In 1847, at the age of 21, Gorton married Fred Gorton, a wealthy paper manufacturer, and the couple moved to Fenton, Michigan. Six years later, after a long illness, she became completely blind. She became temporarily dependent on others to transcribe her thoughts to paper.

Gorton's first prose work, The Fatal Secret, was written wholly with a pencil, but she wrote so rapidly in an unconscious manner that she formed almost an entire new alphabet, unreadable except by those who had followed the transformation. Gorton began using a typewriter for her writing shortly thereafter.

Gorton was widely known by her pen name "Ida Glenwood." Sometimes, she was also called "The Sweet Singer" and "The Blind Bard of Michigan." She went on to publish an additional romance novel, Lily Pearl and The Mistress of Rosedale.

Gorton's first published poem appeared in The Philadelphia Inquirer. She wrote many serials, stories and poems for the Detroit Christian Herald and other papers and periodicals. These included The Fatal Secret, or a Romance of Mackinac Island, Kate Wynans and the Forger's Daughter, Ma Belle Queen, Tangled Threads, Black France, and others.

Gorton was also involved in the temperance movement, presiding at public meetings, lecturing and reciting original poems. Her short career as a platform speaker began with the recitation of a poem entitled Adolphus and Olivia, or a tale of Kansas. She became renowned for her oratorical skill, and the ability to recite poems for over an hour and a half. Governor Reuben Fenton once noted "one must conclude, after listening to 'The Blind Bard of Michigan,' that if we would find the best and deepest poetical thoughts, we must look for them in the emanations from the imprisoned soul." For 20 years, Gorton lectured frequently to audiences in Michigan, before becoming more reclusive in her later years. She used her typewriting skills to share letters with other "shut-ins".

== Death ==
Gorton died on August 10, 1894, at the age of 68, at her home in Fenton. She was buried in Oakwood Cemetery in Fenton.

== Selected works ==
- Fatal Secret, 1873
- The Wife's Appeal: a poem, 1873
- Lily Pearl and the Mistress of Rosedale, 1892
