= Tyler Tingley =

American educator

Principal of Blake School
- In office 1991–1997

13th Principal of Phillips Exeter Academy
- In office 1997–2009
- Preceded by: Kendra Stearns O'Donnell
- Succeeded by: Thomas Edward Hassan

Personal details
- Education: Harvard University (BA, MEd, EdD)

Tyler Chapman Tingley is an American educator who has headed four private secondary schools, including The Blake School and Phillips Exeter Academy.

== Education ==
Tingley received his undergraduate training at Harvard College, receiving an A.B. in 1968 and his M.Ed. and Ed.D. degrees from Harvard Graduate School of Education in 1976 and 1982.

== Career ==
Tingley began his career as a teacher of English at Kingswood-Oxford School in West Hartford, CT. After holding a variety of administrative positions there, he was named its headmaster in 1986, the school’s first graduate to hold the position. Kingswood-Oxford gives an annual award named after Tingley, The Tyler C. Tingley Award, to a graduating student who has excelled both academically and in community service.

From 1991 to 1997, he was the principal of Blake School in Minneapolis, Minnesota. Under his leadership, the school was twice named a National School of Excellence.

From 1997 to 2009, he was principal of Phillips Exeter Academy. Under his leadership, Exeter offered free tuition to lower-income families and changed its rules to allow gay and lesbian faculty couples to serve as live-in role models in school dormitories.

In 2009, he became co-head of Avenues: The World School.

Tingley has served as president of the Connecticut Association of Independent Schools and the Minnesota Association of Independent Schools. He has also been a director of the National Association of Independent Schools and president of the Headmasters Association. He is a trustee of United World College-USA, Shady Hill School and the Edward E. Ford Foundation.

== In popular culture ==
Tingley was tuckerized into Exeter alumnus Dan Brown's novel Angels & Demons as Tyler Tingley, a conspiracy theorist.
