= Faye Hirsch =

American art critic (born 1956)

- Born: 1956 (age 69–70); United States
- Education: University at Buffalo, Yale University
- Occupations: Writer, art critic, educator, editor
- Known for: Art criticism

Faye Hirsch (born 1956) is an American writer, art critic, educator, and editor, specializing in contemporary art and contemporary printmaking. She is part of the faculty in the school of art and design at State University of New York at Purchase.

== Biography ==
Faye Hirsch attended the University at Buffalo, and received a B.A. degree; and a Ph.D. in the history of art from Yale University in 1987.

Hirsch has published frequently in Art in America where she was the senior editor from 2003 until 2012, and prior to that she served as editor-in-chief at Art on Paper. She has written dozens of articles, reviews, and interviews and her work has been included in The New York Times, Artforum, Hyperallergic, Flash Art, and Parkett. Hirsch has written about artists, including Lisa Yuskavage, Lynette Yiadom-Boakye, Nancy Bowen and Nicole Eisenman.

Hirsch has taught at the University of Oregon, the University of Arizona, the School of Visual Arts, the Rhode Island School of Design, and Yale University.
