= Laurie Wayburn =

American author and conservationist

- Born: Laurie Andrea Wayburn; September 27, 1954 (age 71)
- Citizenship: American
- Education: Harvard University, University of California, Davis
- Occupations: Environmentalist, Executive
- Spouse: Constance Best
- Children: Elliott Wayburn-Best
- Parents: Edgar Wayburn (father); Peggy Wayburn (mother)
- Relatives: William Wayburn, Diana Wayburn, Cynthia Wayburn
- Awards: James Irvine Foundation Leadership Award (2008), Kingsbury Browne Conservation Leadership Award (2008)

Laurie Andrea Wayburn (born September 27, 1954) is an American author and conservationist. She was born to two of the 20th century's most influential conservationists, Peggy Wayburn and Edgar Wayburn, on September 28, 1954. Through her father, Wayburn is a direct descendant of Rabbi Jacob Voorsanger, a prominent early Jewish leader in San Francisco and rabbi of Congregation Emanu-El. She transferred to Harvard University after a year at the University of California, Davis, and later graduated from Harvard University. She was the executive director of Point Reyes Bird Observatory from 1989 to 1991. She is the president and co-founder of Pacific Forest Trust. She received a James Irvine Foundation Leadership Award and a Kingsbury Browne Conservation Leadership Award in 2008.

== Bibliography ==
- Wayburn, Laurie (August 21, 1990). "Wetlands restoration". Sausalito Marin Scope – via California Digital Newspaper Collection.
- Best, Constance; Wayburn, Laurie (1995). "In Diversity Is Wealth: Enhancing Financial Returns for Private Forest Landowners". Journal of Forestry. 93 (8): 6–9. doi:10.1093/jof/93.8.6.
- Best, Constance; Wayburn, Laurie (2001). America's Private Forests: Status And Stewardship. Island Press. ISBN 1-55963-901-6.
- Wayburn, Laurie (2009). Forests in United States Climate Policy: A Comprehensive Approach (Report). Lincoln Institute of Land Policy. JSTOR resrep18303. OCLC 1091744377.
- Wayburn, Laurie; Chiono, Anton A. (2010). "The Role of Federal Policy in Establishing Ecosystem Service Markets". Duke Environmental Law & Policy Forum. 20 (2): 385–416. S2CID 166844858.
- Wayburn, Laurie (2011). "Conservation Easements as Tools to Achieve Regulatory Environmental Goals". Law and Contemporary Problems. 74 (4): 175–197. JSTOR 23063179.
- Wayburn, Laurie (June 7, 2013). "Viewpoints: Money grab would hurt state's climate cause". The Sacramento Bee. Archived from the original on February 7, 2014.
- Wayburn, Laurie (September 29, 2017). "Watershed conservation key to solving California's water problems". San Francisco Chronicle.
- Wayburn, Laurie (May 5, 2018). "Invest in watershed improvements, not taller dams". San Francisco Chronicle.
- Wayburn, Laurie (August 29, 2018). "Another reason to save California forests? Our water supply". The Sacramento Bee.
- Wayburn, Laurie (May 13, 2020). "Forests can help boost California's economic recovery". San Francisco Chronicle.
