= Sharon Kopriva =

American painter and sculptor (born 1948)

- Born: Sharon Ortman; February 11, 1948 (age 78); Houston, Texas, United States
- Other names: Sharon Kopriva
- Education: BS (1970) MFA (1981)
- Alma mater: University of Houston
- Known for: Sculpture, painting, mixed media, and installation art

Sharon Kopriva (born February 11, 1948) is an American painter and sculptor who lives and works in Houston, Texas and Hope, Idaho. Kopriva's art is influenced by her Catholic primary school education, as well as exposure to Peruvian and Australian cultures.

== Biography ==
Sharon (Ortman) Kopriva was raised in Houston. She is the middle child of three, and earned a bachelor's degree in art education from the University of Houston in 1970. She taught art for 10 years in the Houston Independent School District before returning to the University of Houston to earn a master's degree in painting in 1981. The Texas Commission on the Arts named Kopriva State Artist of the Year in 2005 for her three-dimensional visual artwork.

Her teachers include New York painter John Alexander and sculptor James Surls. Her friendship with artists Edward Kienholz and Nancy Reddin Kienholz has also impacted Kopriva's work:

== Work ==
"The natural imagery in Kopriva’s work, especially the tree-thronged cathedrals, draws on her frequent visits to the vast forests and woods of Idaho. … While the imagery in these mixed-media paintings is based on actual observation, it also emerges from venerable literary and artistic tradition of fusing forests and cathedrals through metaphor", according to Raphael Rubinstein, art critic.

In late 2015, Kopriva returned her focus to figurative sculpture and began a series out of manila rope pieces called Tubors.
