= Fort Washington, Maryland =

- Census-designated place
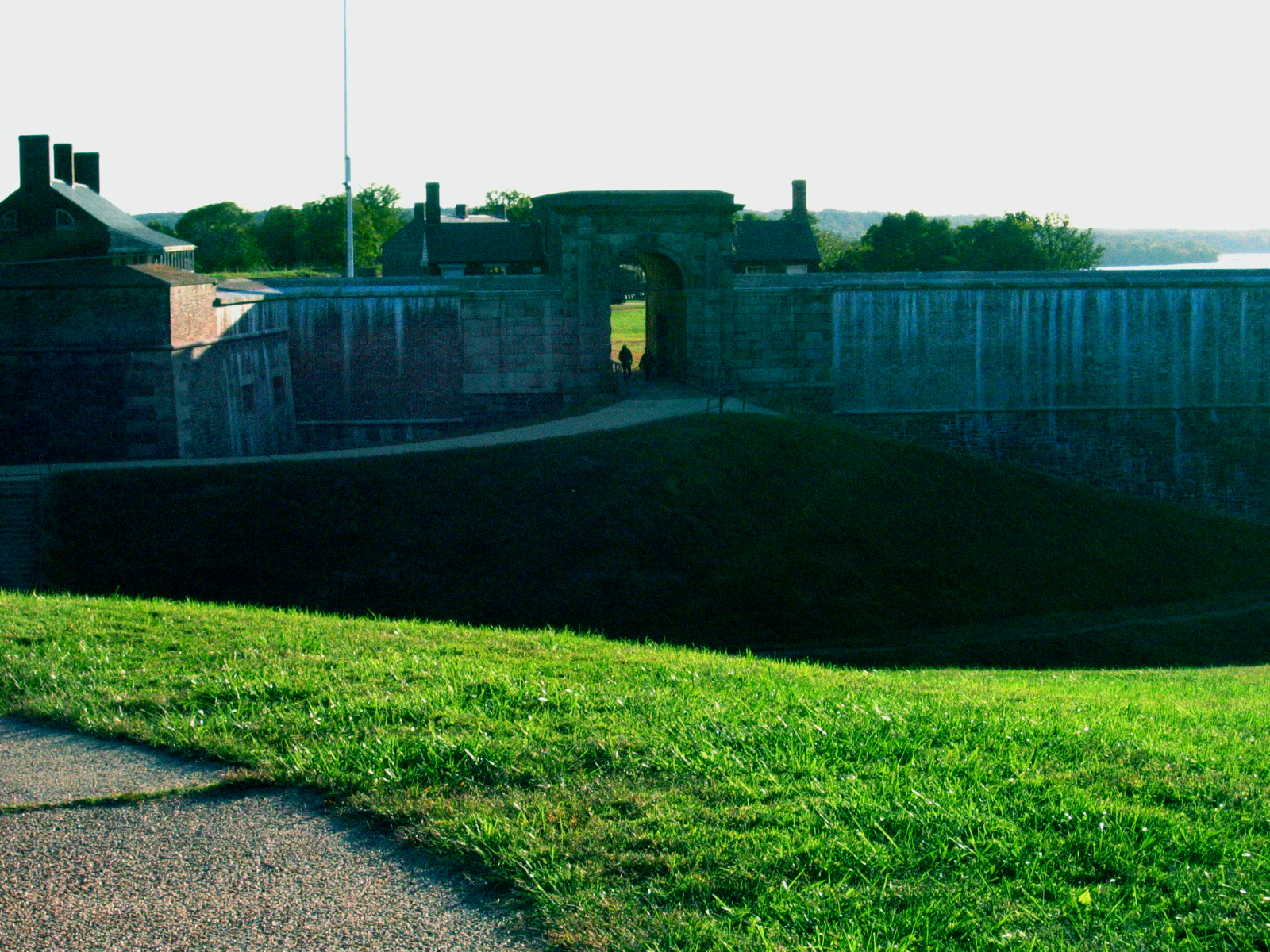
- Fort Washington Park's main gate in October 2004

- Location of Fort Washington in Maryland
- Coordinates: 38°44′37″N 77°0′37″W
- Country: United States
- State: Maryland
- County: Prince George's

Area
  - Total: 16.57 sq mi (42.92 km^{2})
  - Land: 13.80 sq mi (35.73 km^{2})
  - Water: 2.78 sq mi (7.19 km^{2})
- Elevation: 105 ft (32 m)

Population (2020)
  - Total: 24,261
  - Density: 1,758.8/sq mi (679.08/km^{2})
- Time zone: UTC−5 (Eastern (EST))
  - Summer (DST): UTC−4 (EDT)
- ZIP Codes: 20744, 20749
- Area codes: 301, 240
- FIPS code: 24-29525
- GNIS feature ID: 0598313

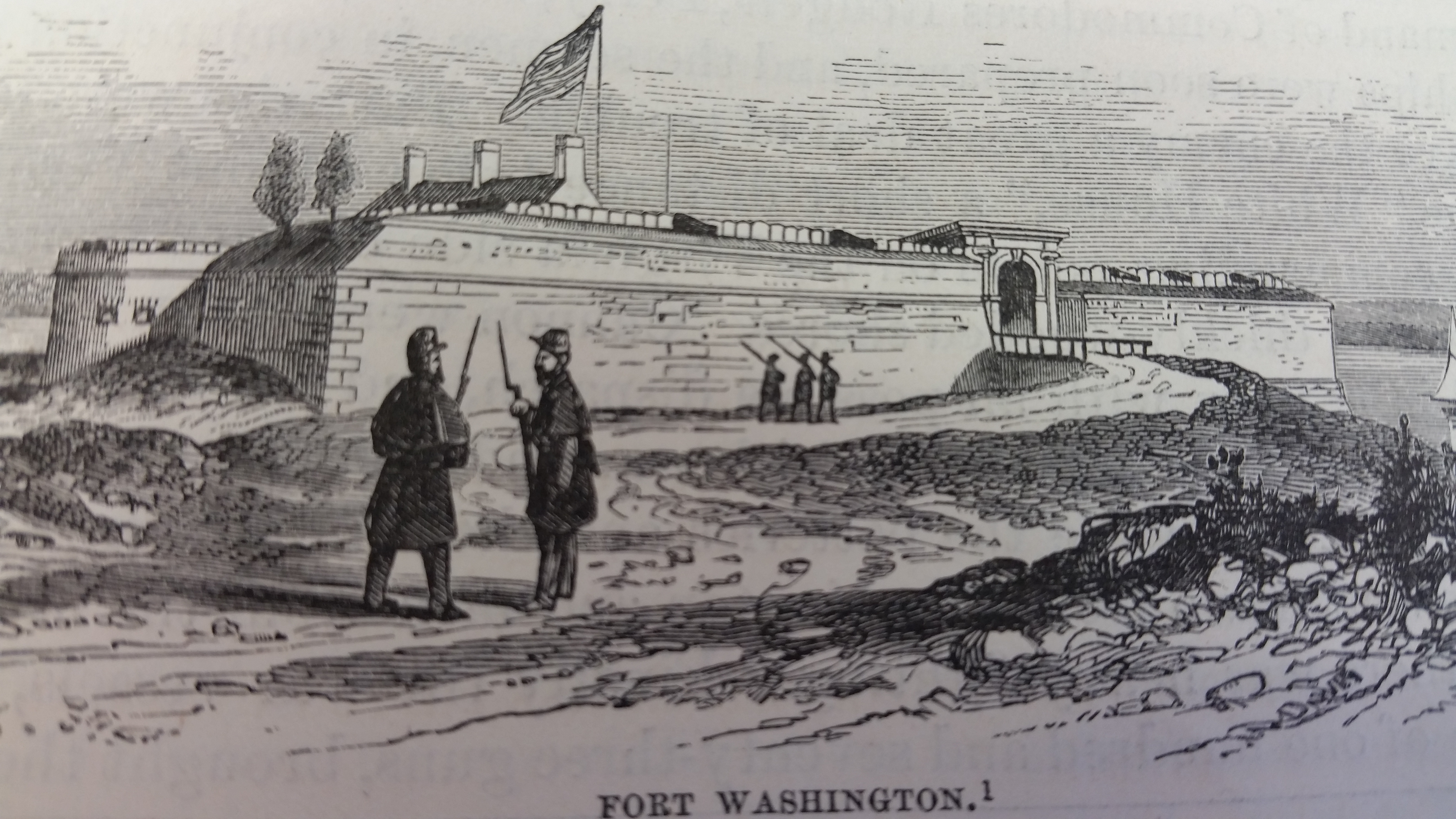
Fort Washington

Fort Washington is an unincorporated area and census-designated place in Prince George's County, Maryland, United States. It borders the Potomac River, situated 20 miles south of downtown Washington, D.C. As of the 2020 census, it had a population of 24,261. The Fort Washington community is located west of Maryland Route 210, with some additional area to the east of the highway.

== History ==
=== The Fort ===
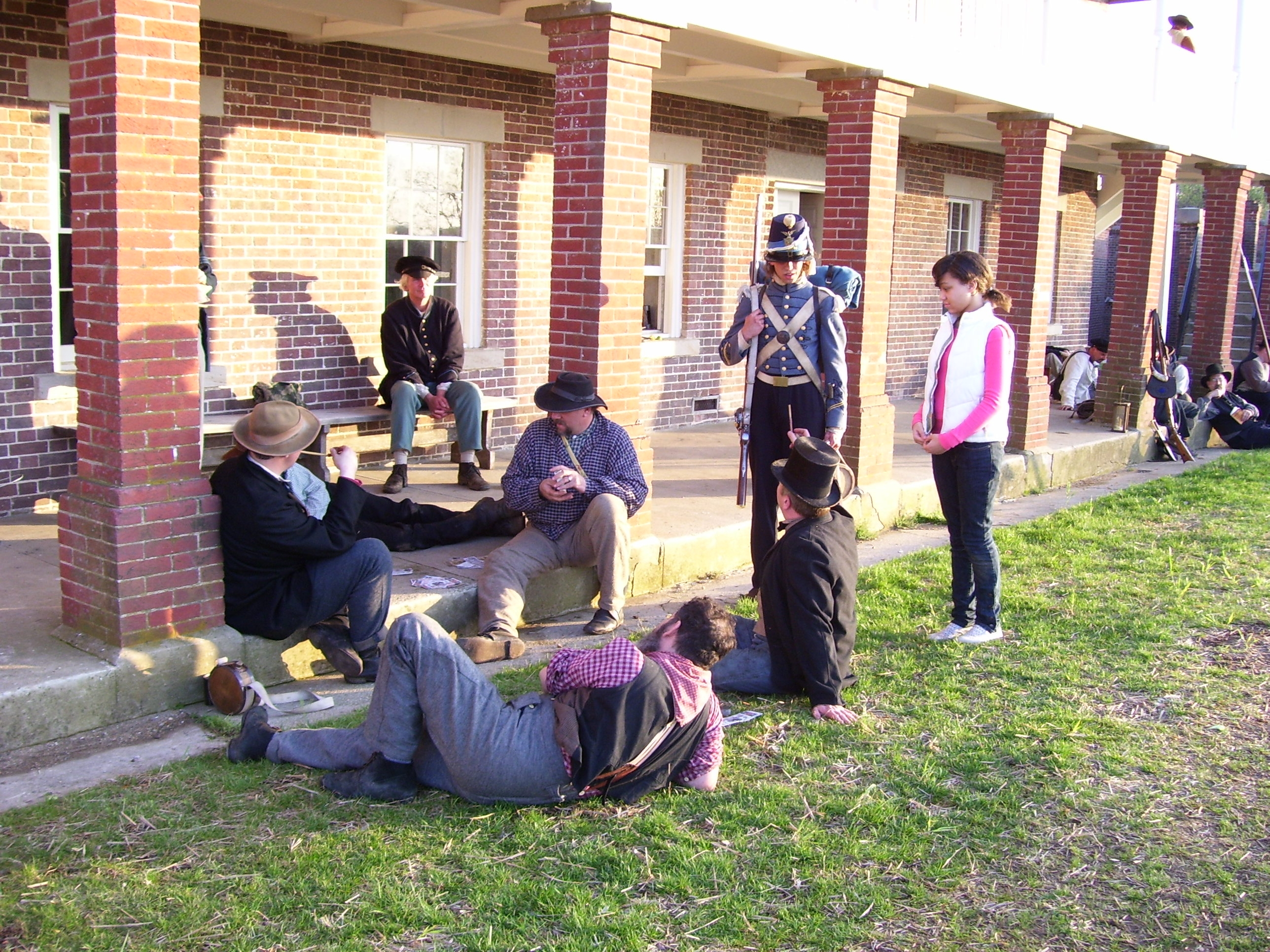
A group of historical reenactors at Fort Washington in April 2008

The community is named for Fort Washington. The first Fort Washington was completed in 1809, and it was the only defensive fort protecting Washington, D.C. until the American Civil War. It consisted of a small earthwork embankment near the shore of the Potomac River. The failure of that fort to stop a British fleet from invading the national capital during the War of 1812 led to the construction of the current, larger, stone fortification. In 1844, a cannon exploded on the USS Princeton as it was passing Fort Washington. During World War II, the US Army's Adjutant General's School was located at the fort, and had billeting for 362 officers and 2,526 enlisted persons.

The site is now part of a park with views of the Potomac River and hiking paths.

=== War of 1812 ===
During the War of 1812 Fort Washington, built to protect the capital from enemy advances on the Potomac River, was captured by the British under the command of Admiral Gordon, three days after the burning of the capital.

=== Civil War ===
Upon the outbreak of the American Civil War, fearing for the safety of Washington in case of attack, Secretary of the Navy Isaac Toucey ordered a detachment of US Marines to garrison the fort.

In May 1865 Secretary of the Navy Gideon Welles ordered the Potomac Flotilla reduced to half strength due to cessation of hostilities. This included the removal of the Marines from Fort Washington.

=== Twentieth century to present ===
Near the fort are many riverfront homes, two marinas, two community pools, and National Golf Club. The area was rural until about 1960, when suburban growth began. Until the founding of the Oxon Hill post office about 1960, the Fort Washington area generally used the mailing address Washington, D.C., except for the few years that Friendly had a post office. In 1980, the postal service split the Fort Washington area from Oxon Hill, defining it as a separate town name. At that time, to make mail sorting easier, they drew the boundary between the two communities to conform to already existing zip code boundaries. The end result sometimes confuses people, since the northern end of the Fort Washington postal area (near the Beltway) identifies more with the communities of Oxon Hill or Temple Hills / Camp Springs but still uses a Fort Washington mailing address.

== Geography ==
According to the United States Census Bureau, the CDP has a total area of 16.57 square miles (42.9 km^{2}), of which 13.79 square miles (35.7 km^{2}) is land and 2.78 square miles (7.2 km^{2}), or 16.8%, is water.

First-time visitors are often confused by the several "Livingston Roads", which repeatedly cross Route 210, as well as by the two separate "Old Fort Roads", causing them to make wrong turns off of Maryland Route 210. Eventually, all roads intersecting Route 210 in the Fort Washington area (from the Beltway as far south as the Highway 210 curve at Piscataway Creek) will be upgraded to controlled-access interchanges (eliminating all traffic signals) gradually during the 2020s.

The fort's land originally included 347 acres, which was last surveyed in June 1944.

== Community institutions ==
The Maryland-National Capital Park and Planning Commission (M-NCPPC) maintains the Harmony Hall Regional Center , including the John Addison Concert Hall, site of community theater ("Tantallon Community Players"), art shows, frequent concerts, and a variety of classes for all ages. A YMCA fitness center operated from 2005 until 2016, and a community center facility opened in 2013 in Fort Washington Forest.

The 12,000-member Ebenezer A.M.E. Church is a large nursery/landscaping business and a popular motorcycle shop. There is a small 50-bed hospital (Fort Washington Hospital).

== Government ==
Prince George's County Police Department District 7 Station in Fort Washington CDP serves the community.

The U.S. Postal Service operates the Fort Washington Post Office in Fort Washington CDP.

The Interagency Training Center, a training center for the National Security Agency, is based in Fort Washington CDP.

== Demographics ==
Historical population
Census	Pop.	Note	%±
1990	24,032		—
2000	23,845		−0.8%
2010	23,717		−0.5%
2020	24,261		2.3%
U.S. Decennial Census; 2010 2020

=== Racial and ethnic composition ===
Fort Washington CDP, Maryland – Racial and ethnic composition Note: the US Census treats Hispanic/Latino as an ethnic category. This table excludes Latinos from the racial categories and assigns them to a separate category. Hispanics/Latinos may be of any race.
Race / Ethnicity (NH = Non-Hispanic)	Pop 2000	Pop 2010	Pop 2020	% 2000	% 2010	% 2020
White alone (NH)	4,254	2,690	2,170	17.84%	11.34%	8.94%
Black or African American alone (NH)	15,925	16,576	15,334	66.79%	69.89%	63.20%
Native American or Alaska Native alone (NH)	79	51	32	0.33%	0.22%	0.13%
Asian alone (NH)	2,452	2,154	2,227	10.28%	9.08%	9.18%
Native Hawaiian or Pacific Islander alone (NH)	15	8	17	0.06%	0.03%	0.07%
Other race alone (NH)	70	56	179	0.29%	0.24%	0.74%
Mixed race or Multiracial (NH)	502	617	828	2.11%	2.60%	3.41%
Hispanic or Latino (any race)	548	1,565	3,474	2.30%	6.60%	14.32%
Total	23,845	23,717	24,261	100.00%	100.00%	100.00%

=== 2020 census ===
As of the 2020 census, Fort Washington had a population of 24,261. The median age was 46.7 years. 18.0% of residents were under the age of 18 and 23.0% of residents were 65 years of age or older. For every 100 females there were 91.3 males, and for every 100 females age 18 and over there were 88.4 males age 18 and over.

100.0% of residents lived in urban areas, while 0.0% lived in rural areas.

There were 8,587 households in Fort Washington, of which 27.3% had children under the age of 18 living in them. Of all households, 50.2% were married-couple households, 16.1% were households with a male householder and no spouse or partner present, and 29.3% were households with a female householder and no spouse or partner present. About 22.0% of all households were made up of individuals and 10.4% had someone living alone who was 65 years of age or older.

There were 8,910 housing units, of which 3.6% were vacant. The homeowner vacancy rate was 1.5% and the rental vacancy rate was 4.0%.

Racial composition as of the 2020 census
Race	Number	Percent
White	2,492	10.3%
Black or African American	15,507	63.9%
American Indian and Alaska Native	87	0.4%
Asian	2,248	9.3%
Native Hawaiian and Other Pacific Islander	23	0.1%
Some other race	2,179	9.0%
Two or more races	1,725	7.1%
Hispanic or Latino (of any race)	3,474	14.3%

=== 2010 census ===
As of the census of 2010, there were 23,717 people, 8,135 households, and 6,319 families residing in the CDP. The population density was 1,719.8 inhabitants per square mile (664.0/km^{2}). There were 8,681 housing units at an average density of 523.0 per square mile (201.9/km^{2}). The racial makeup of the CDP was 70.6% African American, 13.40% White, 9.2% Asian (mostly Filipino), 0.2% Native American, 0.00% Pacific Islander, 3.3% from other races, and 2.38% from two or more races. Hispanic or Latino of any race were 6.6% of the population.

There were 8,135 households, out of which 26.5% had children under the age of 18 living with them, 57.9% were married couples living together, 14.7% had a female householder with no husband present, and 22.3% were non-families. 18.3% of all households were made up of individuals, and 7.1% had someone living alone who was 65 years of age or older. The average household size was 2.89 and the average family size was 3.24.

In the CDP, the population was spread out, with 21.7% under the age of 18, 5.2% from 20 to 24, 21.9% from 25 to 44, 32.9% from 45 to 64, and 16.1% who were 65 years of age or older. The median age was 44.3 years. For every 100 females, there were 91.6 males. For every 100 females age 18 and over, there were 89.3 males.

According to a 2007 estimate, the median income for a household in the CDP was $105,475, and the median income for a family was $111,227. In 2000, males had a median income of $46,656 versus $42,450 for females. The per capita income for the CDP was $30,871. About 2.8% of families and 3.7% of the population were below the poverty line, including 5.0% of those under age 18 and 4.5% of those age 65 or over. By the end of 2020, the CDP ranks # 5 among top 10 richest black communities in US, with an average family income of $114,234.

== Transportation ==
Potomac Airfield is in Friendly CDP, with a Fort Washington address. Formerly Several Metrobus routes served the area, which were P17, P18 and, P19. After the Better Bus Network was launched on June 29, 2025, the three routes were combined to create P97, Prince George’s County Transit: TheBus Route P95 also serves the area, P95 was formerly known as Route 35S. Fort Washington also has a Park and Ride which has the Metrobus P97 serving it currently.

== Education ==
Fort Washington is under the Prince George's County Public Schools district.

Zoned elementary schools serving the CDP are:

- Fort Foote Elementary School
- Fort Washington Forest Elementary School
- Indian Queen Elementary School
- Colin Powell Academy (a merger of Isaac J. Gourdine Middle School and Potomac Landing Elementary School done in 2023)
- Rose Valley Elementary School
- Tayac Elementary School

Zoned middle schools serving the CDP are:

- Oxon Hill Middle School
- Colin Powell Academy
- Accokeek Middle School

Zoned high schools serving the CDP are:

- Friendly High School
- Oxon Hill High School

The following private schools are located in Fort Washington

- National Christian Academy
- The Beddow Montessori School, Fort Washington Campus
- Maryland International Day School

== Notable people ==
- Riddick Bowe, 2 time world heavyweight boxing champion
- Seven Craft, participant of Bad Girls Club Season 17
- Donna Edwards, former U.S. Representative for Maryland's 4th congressional district
- Charles Gittens, first black United States Secret Service agent
- George O. Gore II, actor previously seen on My Wife and Kids
- Mike Gravel, former Senator (D-Alaska) and presidential candidate, previously lived in Tantallon.
- Joe Haden, Florida Gators cornerback and former cornerback for the Pittsburgh Steelers; attended Friendly High School
- Steny Hoyer, Majority Leader, United States House of Representatives, at one time lived in Friendly
- Jarrett Jack, NBA player
- Jeff Kinney, writer of the Diary of a Wimpy Kid series
- Martin Lawrence, Hollywood actor, attended Friendly High School
- G. Gordon Liddy, presidential aide convicted in the Watergate scandal, author, and later talk radio host
- Senator John Melcher of Montana
- Tim Miller, movie director and visual effects artist, animator
- Rev. C. Anthony Muse, Maryland State Senator , pastor of Ark of Safety Church in Upper Marlboro, Maryland
- Reisha Raney, business executive, engineer, and first black woman to serve as a DAR state officer in Maryland
- Stanley Turrentine, jazz musician, lived on Piscataway Drive
- Brian Westbrook, former Villanova football star (1997–2001) and former running back for the San Francisco 49ers and Philadelphia Eagles
- Byron Westbrook, former Salisbury University and Washington Redskins football player.
