= Charles Gittens =

U.S. Secret Service agent (1928–2011)

Charles LeRoy Gittens (August 31, 1928 – July 27, 2011) was an American United States Secret Service agent. Gittens joined the Secret Service in 1956, becoming the agency's first African American agent.

Gittens was born in Cambridge, Massachusetts, on August 31, 1928, as one of his family's seven children. His father was a contractor who had immigrated to the United States from Barbados. He left his high school before graduation in order to enlist in the United States Army. He was promoted to lieutenant in the Army and was stationed in Japan during the Korean War. Gittens earned his GED while serving in the Army. Following the end of the war, Gittens earned a bachelor's degree from present-day North Carolina Central University. He completed the four-year academic program in three years, and graduated magna cum laude with a Bachelor of Arts degree in English and Spanish. As a result, he was bilingual.

Gittens taught at a school in North Carolina for one year. He was encouraged to take the civil service exam, which resulted in his recruitment into the United States Secret Service. He began his career at the agency's office in Charlotte, North Carolina. He then became an investigator at the Secret Service's field office in New York City, where he served for ten years. He was assigned to a "special detail" Secret Service unit, which investigated bank fraud and counterfeiting. Gittens was then transferred to the Secret Service's field office in Puerto Rico, where he guarded New York Governor Nelson Rockefeller during his 1969 trip to the Caribbean and Latin America.

Gittens was promoted to the head of the Secret Service's field office in Washington, D.C., in 1971. He retired from the agency in 1979.

He then joined the United States Department of Justice, where he led investigations of Nazi war criminals who were residing in the United States at the Department's Office of Special Investigations.

Charles Gittens died of complications from a heart attack at the Collington Episcopal Life Care Community, an assisted living facility in Mitchellville, Maryland, on July 27, 2011, at the age of 82. He had moved to the facility from Fort Washington, Maryland, in 2010. His first wife, Ruthie, with whom he had one daughter, died in 1991. He and his second wife, Maureen, divorced.
