= Jessica Todd Harper =

American photographer (born 1975)

Jessica Todd Harper is an American fine-art photographer. She was born in Albany, New York in 1975.

== Biography ==
Harper holds a B.A. in art history from Bryn Mawr College and an M.F.A. in photography from Rochester Institute of Technology.

Her photographs have been featured in Photo District News; Camera Austria; Frankfurter Allgemeine Zeitung; Newsweek; and O, The Oprah Magazine. Exhibits include The International Museum of Photography, George Eastman House, Rochester, NY; The Museum of Fine Arts, Houston; the Allentown Art Museum; the Woodmere Art Museum in Philadelphia; Blue Sky Gallery in Portland; Paul Kopeikin Gallery in L.A.; Cohen Amador Gallery in New York; The Photographic Center Northwest in Seattle; and The Photographic Resource Center in Boston. Harper is a recent project competition winner at Center (formally the Santa Fe Center for Photography) and selected artist of "PDN's 30: Our Choice of Emerging Photographers to Watch." Harper teaches at Swarthmore College.

She was a finalist for Smithsonian Institution's National Portrait Gallery 2016 Outwin Boochever Portrait Competition.

Her work is included in the collections of the Museum of Fine Arts Houston, the George Eastman Museum and the International Center of Photography, New York.

Her work is also part of the Kinship exhibition at the National Portrait Gallery-Smithsonian Institution, Washington DC,

== Publications ==
Interior Exposure (2008) By Jessica Todd Harper

The Home Stage (2014) By Jessica Todd Harper

Here(2022) By Jessica Todd Harper

Lenscratch, “Jessica Todd Harper”, by Aline Smithson (2009)

Lenscratch, “Jessica Todd Harper: Here", by Aline Smithson (2022)

“Artist Talk with Photographer Jessica Todd Harper.” YouTube, YouTube, 16 Dec. 2008

“Jessica Todd Harper on Beauty, Family, and Photography.” Econlib, 6 Dec. 2022, (podcast)

Wehelie, Benazir. “Not Your Typical Childhood Photos.” CNN, Cable News Network, 9 Mar. 2015

Green, Graeme. “A 'Wrong' Family Moment That's Full of Truth ... Jessica Todd Harper's Best Photograph.” The Guardian, Guardian News and Media, 12 Oct. 2022,

Harper, Jessica Todd. “The Family Album: A Personal View.” Gente di Fotografia, 2023.

== Exhibitions ==
2022

The National Portrait Gallery, The Smithsonian, Kinship (accompanying book, Kinship).

Rick Wester Fine Art, New York, NY Here (solo)

Le Centre Claude Cahun, Nantes, France, Here

2018

AIPAD, Rick Wester Fine Art

The National: Best Contemporary Photography 2018 at the Fort Wayne Museum of Art. One of 3 invited artists.

The National Portrait Gallery, The Smithsonian, The Outwin Boochever Portrait Competition

2017-16

The National Portrait Gallery, The Smithsonian, The Outwin Boochever Portrait Competition

The McNay Art Museum Telling Tales: Contemporary Narrative Photography (catalog)

Galerie Confluence, Nantes, France The Home Stage (solo)

2015

The Print Center, Philadelphia The Home Stage, (solo)

Galerie Confluence, Nantes, France The Home Stage, (solo)

2014

The Portland Art Museum Blue Sky: The Oregon Center for the Photographic Arts at 40

Haverford College The Female Gaze: A Survey of Photographs by Women from the 19th to the 21st Centuries

Rick Wester Fine Art, New York, NY The Home Stage (solo)

2013

The George Eastman House International Museum of Photography & Film The Gender Show

2012

Galerie Confluence, Nantes, France Interior Exposure (solo)

Gallery 339, Philadelphia More Photos About Buildings and Food

Philadelphia Photographic Arts Center 3rd Annual Photography Exhibition First Prize winner. Jurors: Kathy Ryan (NYT Mag) & Natasha Egan (Museum of Contemporary Photography)

2011

New Orleans Museum of Art The Art of Caring. Two year national tour with accompanying book. Curated by Dr. Cynthia Goodman.

Australian Centre for Photography Installation, Sydney, Australia100 Portraits

2010

Corcoran Gallery of Art 100 Portraits curated by Flak Photo’s Andy Adams

Photographic Center North West, Portland, OR. Photolucida’s Critical Mass 2009 Top Finalists Maine Media Workshops Arnold Newman and his Legacy

2009

The George Eastman House International Museum of Photography & Film Seeing Ourselves: Masterpieces of American Photography a traveling exhibition

The George Eastman House International Museum of Photography & FilmWhat We’re Collecting Now: The Family Photographed

Gallery 339, Philadelphia Personal Views

Pilner International Photography Awards Competition International tour. Best in Show. curated by Bill Hunt from among NY Photo Festival winners

2008

Cohen Amador Gallery, New York, NY Interior Exposure (solo)

The Museum of Art, Ball State University Conversation Piece, (catalog), (solo)

2007

The Museum of Fine Arts, Houston Photo Forum

The Cooper Union Indwelling juried by Joyce Tenneson

Center for Performing Arts, Houston, Generations of Caring curated by Anne Tucker

2006

The Hunderdon Museum of Art Risky Business

Photographic Center Northwest, Seattle Portraits from Private Spaces (solo)

Photographic Resource Center, Boston, MA, Group Portrait

2005

Cohen Amador Gallery, New York, NY Inaugural Exhibition of Gallery Artists

Paul Kopeikin Gallery, Los Angeles, CA Several Artists Consider Books

Notre Dame University Jessica Todd Harper, (solo)

The Silver Eye Center For Photography Fellowship

2004

The Woodmere Art Museum, Philadelphia, The Woodmere Triennial (catalog)

The Silver Eye Center For Photography Fellowship

2003

Pittsburgh Filmmakers, Pittsburgh, PA Portraits from Private Spaces (solo)

The Pittsburgh Center for the Arts The 2003 Biennial (catalog)

The Silver Eye Center For Photography Fellowship

2002

Blue Sky Gallery- Portland, OR, David Hilliard and Jessica Todd Harper, (catalog)

The Hartnett Gallery- The University of Rochester, Rochester, NY Legacy (solo)

Houston Center for Photography- Houston, TX Scenes from a Marriage Diary

Allentown Art Museum- Allentown, PA Scenes from a Marriage Diary (catalog) (solo)

The Silver Eye Center For Photography Fellowship

2001

The Silver Eye Center For Photography Fellowship

Rochester Institute of Technology MFA Thesis Show- Legacy (solo)
