= Melissa Zink =

American artist (1932–2009)

- Born: 1932; Kansas City, Missouri
- Died: 2009 (aged 76–77); Taos, New Mexico
- Occupations: Artist, sculptor

Melissa Zink (1932–2009) was an American artist. An active member of the Taos, New Mexico art scene, she blended storytelling with sculpture, and described the enchantment of books and the imaginary worlds they evoked as the focus of her work. Critics lauded her as a "late bloomer" because she only began to exhibit and sell her multi-media works of ceramics, cast bronze, and collage, when she was in her forties. She became known for her "three-dimensional stories" and "dream-like dioramas" in clay, interior scenes that blend whimsy with surrealism. Later she cast large bronze statues of human figures embossed with texts drawn from dictionaries and illuminated manuscripts. In 2001 she won a Governor's Award for Excellence in the Arts from the state of New Mexico. In 2021, one of her works featured in a special exhibit at the New Mexico Museum of Art entitled, "Southwest Rising: Contemporary Art and the Legacy of Elaine Horwich," which featured a group of artists in the 1970s and 1980s who together launched a movement described as "new Western art" or "Southwest pop".

== Education and career ==
Melissa Zink was born in Kansas City, Missouri. She attended the Emma Willard School, Swarthmore College, the University of Chicago, and the Kansas City Art Institute. She later admitted that her professors' efforts to push her and her peers towards abstract expressionism during the 1950s deterred her from pursuing a career in art. Instead she worked for many years by designing picture frames and operating an embroidery and craft shop while continuing to paint and experiment with various media in her free time. In her forties, she married Nelson Zink, who encouraged her to pursue her artistic ambitions.

The owner of the Parks Gallery in Taos, which represented her for many years, described her works as aiming to replicate through multi-media art the "book experience, that altered state of consciousness we enter when engrossed in a book." Though known primarily for her clay dioramas and bronze figural sculptures, in later years she also created multi-media, collage wall hangings that incorporated fabrics and painted elements.

In 2000 Zink represented New Mexico at an exhibit of women artists called From the States held at Washington, D.C.'s National Museum of Women in the Arts. In 2006 the Harwood Museum of Art in Taos staged an exhibition on her work. In 2009, following her death, the Taos Art Museum and Fechin House staged a memorial exhibition entitled, "Melissa Zink: Her Singular World."

She featured among leading women artists in the book Exposures: Women & Their Art by Betty Ann Brown (1989).

Work by Zink is in the collection of the Harwood Museum of Art, the New Mexico Museum of Art, the Albuquerque Museum of Art and History, and the Roswell Museum and Art Center.
