= Nancy Bowen =

American visual artist

- Born: 1955; Providence, Rhode Island, United States
- Education: Hunter College, School of the Art Institute of Chicago
- Known for: Sculpture, collage
- Awards: Anonymous Was A Woman Award, National Endowment for the Arts, New York Foundation for the Arts
- Website: Nancy Bowen

Nancy Bowen, Artemis Dilemma, shell, ceramic, chair and mixed media, 52" x 16" x 16", 2016.

Nancy Bowen (born 1955) is an American visual artist. She is known for two main groups of work that share qualities of hybridity and multiplicity in their materials and inspirations: largely abstract sculptures and collaged works on paper. Writers such as curator Nina Felshin situate her sculpture amid a strain of feminist art based in the physical body (rather than social construction), which emerged in the 1980s to reclaim female imagery from male-dominated conceptions of women often theorized under the concept of the "male gaze." According to Felshin, in Bowen's work this involves an "exploration of the fragmented, internal body as a means of communicating the visceral experience of [embodiment] … By fashioning anatomically evocative objects from tactile, sensuous and sometimes decorative 'craft' materials … [she] emphasizes the body as a sensory instrument." Bowen's later collages connect her New England roots and Eastern spiritualism through the language of contemporary art.

Bowen has exhibited at venues including the Museum of Arts and Design (New York), Boston Center for the Arts, Corcoran Gallery of Art, Contemporary Arts Center in Cincinnati, Museum fur Angewandte Kunst (Frankfort) and Corning Museum of Glass. She has received awards from Anonymous Was A Woman and the National Endowment for the Arts, among others. Bowen is a professor emerita at Purchase College, SUNY and is based in Brooklyn, New York.

== Early life and career ==
Bowen was born in Providence, Rhode Island in 1955, into a family that dates back twelve generations in New England. She was prompted by an early interest in biology to enroll in pre-med at Stanford University, but soon turned to architecture, and then art. After transferring to the School of the Art Institute of Chicago (SAIC), she earned a BFA in 1978. At SAIC, she was drawn to surrealism, outsider art, feminism and the work of women artists like Louise Bourgeois and her teacher Ree Morton, interests that planted the seeds of her longstanding exploration of the physical experience of the female body.

Bowen moved to New York City in 1980 and began exhibiting her work, appearing in group shows at the SculptureCenter, and Queens Museum, Hyde Park Art Center (Chicago), Centre d'Art Contemporain Genève and Institute for Contemporary Art, Richmond. Her first solo exhibitions took place at Galerie Farideh Cadot (Paris, 1981) and Susan Caldwell Gallery in (New York, 1983). Her early work consisted of small, symbolic dollhouse-like constructions—formally balanced settings characterized by odd angles and complex perspectives that were absent people. She gradually introduced anonymous figures in metaphorical, dynamic poses exploring female experience and sexuality, placed over vividly painted relief or shadowbox structures, and later, abstract sculptural settings. In the later 1980s, she explored that theme through larger-than-life figures and heads bearing an Eastern influence which she melded with simple sculptural shapes.

After completing an MFA degree at Hunter College in 1990, Bowen began producing the abstracted sculptural work for which she became more widely known, receiving critical attention for solo and two-person exhibitions at Annina Nosei Gallery (1990–93) and One Great Jones (1996) in New York, Betsy Rosenfield Gallery (Chicago, 1991), and Wesleyan University (1998). During that period, she began teaching, serving at Sarah Lawrence College, Columbia University, Massachusetts College of Art and Bard College between 1990 and 2004. Bowen wrote about her experiences with institutional sexism and male privilege in the first part of her university career in a 2018 Hyperallergic opinion article titled, "The Pervasive Power of Male Privilege at America’s Elite Universities." In 2001, she joined the art faculty at Purchase College, SUNY, serving as a professor in sculpture until 2024, when she was named a professor emerita.

== Work and reception ==
Nancy Bowen, Black Heart, clay, copper, turmeric and mixed media, 24" x 140" x 96", 1998.

Artforum's Barry Schwabsky described Bowen's work as "pointed extrapolations of form; a cross-pollination of craft traditions [with] sculptural concerns." Her sculpture has been linked to artists such as Louise Bourgeois, Rona Pondick and Kiki Smith—and further back to Brancusi and Jean Arp—who sought to evoke the body without actually depicting it. Like those artists, Bowen creates metaphoric and metonymic representations of physical, psychological or social experience using strategies such as fragmentation, abstraction, exaggeration and excess.

In Bowen's case, her concern has largely focused on haptic experience of the (primarily) female body, often through an inside-out focus what has been called the "grotesque body." Her ambiguous objects often suggest partly familiar yet alien forms—amalgamations of distorted bodies, uncertain species, furniture and household objects. As a result, critics often describe her work in contradictory terms: beautiful and gross, erotic and vulgar, whimsical and discomfiting, attractive and repelling. Judith Russi Kirshner placed Bowen's "odd corporeality … someplace between the imaginative poles represented by Disney and Bosch."

The hybrid character of Bowen's sculpture and collages extends beyond form to her incongruous mixing of disparate materials, techniques, sources and content. Critics suggest that her use of elements not inherently linked to the body seduces viewers to grapple with the work's sometimes visceral subject matter. In her sculpture, she has consistently employed unusual combinations of materials related to craft (and by that association, to women)—clay, glass, wax, ribbon, beads, synthetic hair, copper and wire—as well as non-Western symbolic systems of representation and thought. She takes a similar, loosely archeological approach to her works on paper, scavenging ornamental motifs from other cultures and belief systems that she mixes, adds and redacts in relation to more personal elements. Hyperallergic critic Faye Hirsch describes them as "elegant images that vault through time and place, from chakras … to astrological signs and defunct alphabets."

=== Sculpture, 1989–present ===
In the early 1990s Bowen orchestrated biomorphic ceramic and blown-glass vessels and unconventional, curved metal supports into sculptures that functioned as expressions of sensory knowledge, feminist critique and send-ups of pedestal sculpture traditions (e.g., Astriction, 1990). Alternately graceful and clunky, ethereal and carnal, they triggered contradictory associations: prosthetic devices and ornamental plant stands, ambiguous body parts, constricting 19th-century undergarment support. Several of these works, including her Seven Aspects of the Body series, were related to the Indian chakras—the seven spiritual points of energy in the body according to Hindu philosophy—evoking the actions of subtitles, such as Touching, Burning, Breathing and Visceral Hearing.

Bowen took a more expansive approach in subsequent pieces, using cascading forms to viscerally represent bodily sensations (Aural Obsession, 1993) or female roles in an unsentimental, sometimes disconcerting fashion, as in Parthenogenesis (1993), a structure of thorny, rose-cane-like branches with seven nesting grub forms made of glass. Her exhibition "Figuring the Body" (1998, with Nancy Davidson) was anchored by the elaborate floor piece Black Heart, which featured a gigantic heart of clay sprouting tentacle-like copper wires that spilled onto a bed of turmeric powder rimmed by blood-red, leaf-like forms.

Nancy Bowen, All-American Personalities with Kali’s Tongues, gouache and digital collage on found book, 51" x 37", 2018.

In the 2000s, Bowen produced open, mixed-media structures that reviewers likened to futuristic growths suggesting "fantastical gardens" or part-plant, part-creature species. Boston Globe critic Cate McQuaid described works like Cerebral Flora (2004) as "comical, excited and strangely beautiful" pieces that "make seen the unseen—the explosion of an idea or an anatomical eruption." Similarly, Exalt (2007) featured a Gaudi-like pedestal studded with mirrors sprouting a vine with blooming resin ruffs.

Bowen introduced more imposing, massed structures implying spiritual power and totems embedded with powerfully female imagery in her later works. In Territory (2010) she draped a lacy garment of blue beads over a swelling, mountainous, vaguely anthropomorphic figure of unpainted white plaster topped with a jeweled porcelain tower. Parasol (2010) was a swelling, curvy plaster form sprouting a cast-plaster bamboo pole crowned with a blue-beaded, parasol-like tiara, while Artemis Dilemma (2016) drew upon the multi-breasted, ancient Artemis statue of Ephesus, placing a giant conch shell on a mid-section of pink cast-ceramic breasts and a decorative base set on a small chair.

=== Works on paper, 2010–present ===
Bowen's analog-digital collages coalesce the disparate cultures and languages of contemporary art, laconic Yankee practicalism and Eastern belief into what critic Nancy Princenthal called works of "hypnotic complexity." The layered works she exhibited at Purchase College in 2011 combined meteorological and astronomical lists and text from 19th-century farmers' almanacs (from her father's collection), rubbings of early American tombstones taken by her grandfather and linear patterns recalling Eastern imagery. They included Blue Angel, a collage in which she doubled a grave marker impression of a winged skull over a checkered ground of almanac entries webbed with black thread and colored-paper circles that suggested a Tantric chart.

Nancy Bowen, Spectral Evidence, installation, Westchester Center for the Arts, 2021.

Her painted and text-filled pieces exhibited at the Kentler International Drawing Space (2018) pieced together fragments of maps, engravings, pamphlets, stamps, picture frames and book pages, evoking unidentified myths, archetypes and rituals, often involving the female body. Writer Sarah Sentilles identified redaction as crucial to this work "as a critical tool [that] reminds viewers there is always misinformation and missing information" and as "a refusal of oppressive meaning-making systems." For example, in All American Personalities with Kali's Tongues (2018) Bowen covered over stories from an old book on "great American personalities"—all of them male—with color blocks and an abstraction of a woman with strands emitting from her body that suggested a reclamation of power.

In her thirty-year survey at the Westchester Center for the Arts (2023) Bowen presented collages alongside sculpture and a related installation referencing her family history. The installation, Spectral Evidence (2021), consisted of twenty squat "grave markers" with wings, skull heads and shoes projecting from beneath that stood before a ghostly, faceless life-size figure wearing a black hair shirt. Each marker carried the name of a person killed during the Salem witch trials, which were presided over by nine judges, among them Bowen's ancestor, Samuel Sewall, who later repented. Bowen collaborated with the poet Elizabeth Willis—a descendant of one of the women executed as a witch—on the show's related series of collages and a book, Spectral Evidence: The Witch Book (2023).

== Recognition ==
Bowen has received the Anonymous was a Woman Award (2017) and fellowships from the National Endowment for the Arts (1994), New York Foundation for the Arts (1989) and Art Matters (1986), among other recognition. She has been awarded artist residencies from the American Antiquarian Society, Dora Maar House (Brown Foundation, France), Jentel Arts, MacDowell, MassMoCA, Sanskriti Foundation and Yaddo, as well as from craft-oriented organizations such as the Centre International de Recherche sur le Verre et les Arts Plastiques (CIRVA), Pilchuck Glass School and European Ceramics Work Centre. Bowen's work belongs to the public art collections of the Corning Museum of Glass, Neuberger Museum of Art and DePauw University Galleries, among others.
