= Edgar Wayburn =

American environmentalist (1906–2010)

- Born: Edgar Arthur Waxelbaum; September 17, 1906; Macon, Georgia, U.S.
- Died: March 5, 2010 (aged 103); San Francisco, California, U.S.
- Education: University of Georgia; Harvard Medical School
- Occupations: Physician, environmentalist
- Spouse: Peggy Wayburn
- Children: Laurie Wayburn, William Wayburn, Diana Wayburn, Cynthia Wayburn
- Family: Elliott Wayburn-Best
- Awards: Presidential Medal of Freedom (1999), Albert Schweitzer Prize for Humanitarianism (1995), Howard Zahniser Lifetime Achievement Award

Edgar Arthur Wayburn (September 17, 1906 – March 5, 2010) was an American environmentalist who served as the president of the Sierra Club five times in the 1960s. He has been recognized as one of the least-known yet most successful defenders of America's natural heritage. Wayburn played a crucial role in the establishment of significant achievements, including the creation of the Golden Gate National Recreation Area, the creation and subsequent expansion of Redwood National Park and Point Reyes National Seashore, and the expansion of Mount Tamalpais State Park.

== Biography ==
Wayburn was born Edgar Arthur Waxelbaum on September 17, 1906, in Macon, Georgia to Lewis Isaac Waxelbaum and Marian "Mamie" Voorsanger Waxelbaum. He was a direct descendant of Rabbi Jacob Voorsanger, a prominent early Jewish leader in San Francisco and rabbi of Congregation Emanu-El. Wayburn graduated from the University of Georgia in 1926 and from Harvard Medical School in 1930. In 1933, he relocated to San Francisco to begin his medical practice. Wayburn's involvement with the Sierra Club began in 1939 when he joined a burro trip. After serving four years in the military as a doctor with the Army Air Forces in England, he returned to San Francisco. He was elected to the executive committee of the local Sierra Club chapter and established its first conservation committee. In 1947, Wayburn married Peggy Elliott, and together they actively participated in key conservation battles of their time, aiming to preserve wild places for future generations to explore and enjoy. Notably, Wayburn played a central role in the establishment of Redwoods National Park and the Golden Gate National Recreation Area, and contributed to the passage of the Alaska National Interest Lands Conservation Act.

President Clinton presents Edgar Wayburn with the Presidential Medal of Freedom in 1999

In 1995, he was awarded the Albert Schweitzer Prize for Humanitarianism and in 1999 President Clinton awarded him the Presidential Medal of Freedom. Upon presenting the 1999 Presidential Medal of Freedom to Wayburn, President Clinton said that he had "saved more of our wilderness than any other person alive." The Los Angeles Times wrote an article commending the award, saying "The White House has made a well-informed choice in selecting Wayburn, 92, as a recipient next Wednesday of the Medal of Freedom, the nation's highest civilian honor."

Wayburn published his memoir Your Land and Mine: Evolution of a Conservationist in 2004.

Wayburn was honored at a 40th Anniversary Gala Celebration as the recipient of the inaugural Howard C. Zahniser Lifetime Achievement Award, given to someone whose life of achievement in protecting wilderness most closely parallels those of the person principally responsible for the Wilderness Act.

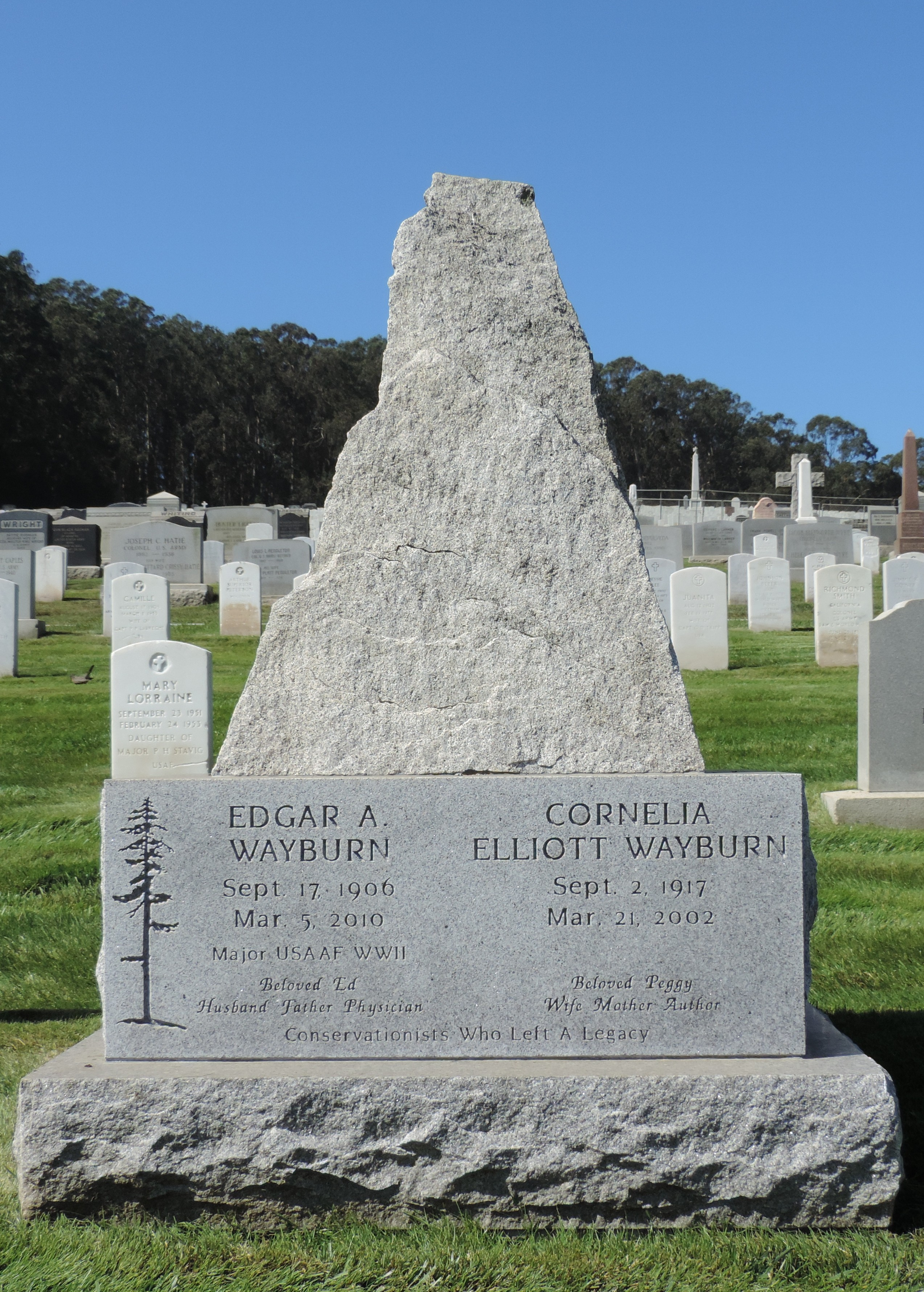
Wayburn's gravestone

He died of natural causes on the evening of March 5, 2010 at the age of 103. At the time he was at his home in San Francisco with his family by his side. He was survived by four children: Cynthia Wayburn, Diana Wayburn, Laurie Wayburn, and William Wayburn. He was remembered by the Los Angeles Times as, "a San Francisco physician and longtime president of the Sierra Club who was credited with protecting more parks and wilderness areas than any other American."

== Activism ==
Wayburn served five terms as the Sierra Club's elected president, and was named the club's Honorary President in 1993. During a half-century of environmental achievements, Wayburn led and won campaigns to protect millions of acres of America's coasts, mountains, forests and tundra. Wayburn has left his mark in the following ways:

- Establishing the nation's largest urban park, the Golden Gate National Recreation Area. Included in the park's 76,000 acres (310 km^{2}) expanse are San Francisco's beaches, Alcatraz and the Presidio
- Protecting over 100 million acres (400,000 km^{2}) of Alaskan wild lands with the Alaska National Interest Lands Conservation Act, which doubled the size of Denali National Park, created 10 new National Parks, and doubled the size of America's National Park system
- Creating Redwood National Park, and then doubling the park's size 10 years later;
- Increasing the area of California's Mount Tamalpais State Park from 870 to 6,300 acres (3.5 to 25.5 km^{2}). Mount Tamalpais is now among the state's 10 most-visited state parks
- Establishing the Point Reyes National Seashore
- Establishing Wilderness areas throughout the American West
