= List of airports in Maryland =

This is a list of airports in Maryland (a U.S. state), grouped by type and sorted by location. It contains all public-use and military airports in the state. Some private-use and former airports may be included where notable, such as airports that were previously public-use, those with commercial enplanements recorded by the FAA or airports assigned an IATA airport code.

== Airports ==
This list contains the following information:

- **City served** – The city generally associated with the airport, as per the airport's master record with the Federal Aviation Administration. This is not always the actual location since some airports are located in smaller towns outside of the city they serve. It is not meant to be a complete list of cities served, which can be found in or added to each airport's Wikipedia article.
- **FAA** – The location identifier assigned by the Federal Aviation Administration (FAA). These are linked to each airport's page at the Maryland Aviation Administration's airport directory.
- **IATA** – The airport code assigned by the International Air Transport Association (IATA). Those that do not match the FAA code are shown in bold.
- **ICAO** – The location indicator assigned by the International Civil Aviation Organization (ICAO).
- **Airport name** – The official airport name. Those shown in **bold** indicate the airport has scheduled passenger service on commercial airlines.
- **Role** – One of four FAA airport categories, as per the 2021–2025 National Plan of Integrated Airport Systems (NPIAS) report released September 2020:
  - P-s: Commercial service – primary are publicly owned airports that receive scheduled passenger service and have more than 10,000 passenger boardings (enplanements) each year. Each primary airport is sub-classified by the FAA as one of the following four "hub" types (s):
    - L: Large hub that accounts for at least 1% of total U.S. passenger enplanements.
    - M: Medium hub that accounts for between 0.25% and 1% of total U.S. passenger enplanements.
    - S: Small hub that accounts for between 0.05% and 0.25% of total U.S. passenger enplanements.
    - N: Nonhub that accounts for less than 0.05% of total U.S. passenger enplanements, but more than 10,000 annual enplanements.
  - CS: Commercial service – nonprimary are publicly owned airports that receive scheduled passenger service and have at least 2,500 passenger boardings each year.
  - R: Reliever airports are designated by the FAA to relieve congestion at a large commercial service airport and to provide more general aviation access to the overall community.
  - GA: General aviation airports are the largest single group of airports in the U.S. airport system. They are public-use airports that do not have scheduled service or have scheduled service with less than 2,500 passenger boardings each year.
- **Enplanements** – The number of enplanements (commercial passenger boardings) that occurred at the airport in calendar year 2024, as per FAA records released September 2025.

City served	FAA	IATA	ICAO	Airport name	Role	Enplanements (2024)
				**Commercial service – primary airports**		
Baltimore	BWI	BWI	KBWI	**Baltimore/Washington International Airport**	P-L	13,221,461
Hagerstown	HGR	HGR	KHGR	**Hagerstown Regional Airport** (Richard A. Henson Field)	P-N	41,508
Salisbury	SBY	SBY	KSBY	**Salisbury Regional Airport**	P-N	60,442
				**Reliever airports**		
Baltimore / Middle River	MTN	MTN	KMTN	Martin State Airport	R	107
Frederick	FDK	FDK	KFDK	Frederick Municipal Airport	R	20
Gaithersburg	GAI	GAI	KGAI	Montgomery County Airpark	R	381
Indian Head	2W5			Maryland Airport	R	12
Odenton / Fort Meade	FME	FME	KFME	Tipton Airport	R	39
Westminster	DMW		KDMW	Carroll County Regional Airport (Jack B. Poage Field)	R	25
				**General aviation airports**		
Cambridge	CGE	CGE	KCGE	Cambridge-Dorchester Regional Airport	GA	30
College Park	CGS	CGS	KCGS	College Park Airport	GA	0
Crisfield	W41			Crisfield-Somerset Airport	GA	
Cumberland / Wiley Ford	CBE	CBE	KCBE	Greater Cumberland Regional Airport	GA	1
Easton	ESN	ESN	KESN	Easton Airport (Newnam Field)	GA	120
Leonardtown	2W6	LTW		St. Mary's County Regional Airport (was Capt. Walter F. Duke Regional)	GA	0
Oakland	2G4			Garrett County Airport	GA	
Ocean City	OXB	OCE	KOXB	Ocean City Municipal Airport	GA	53
Stevensville	W29			Bay Bridge Airport	GA	
				**Other public-use airports** (not listed in NPIAS)		
Annapolis / Edgewater	ANP	ANP	KANP	Lee Airport		47
Baltimore	W48			Essex Skypark		
Baltimore	4MD			Pier 7 Heliport		
Churchville	0W3			Harford County Airport		
Clinton	W32			Washington Executive Airport (Hyde Field)		
Cumberland	1W3			Mexico Farms Airport		
Elkton	58M			Claremont Airport (was Cecil County Airport)		
Fallston	W42			Fallston Airport		
Friendly	VKX		KVKX	Potomac Airfield		
Havre de Grace	M06			Havre de Grace Seaplane Base		
Laytonsville	W50			Davis Airport		
Massey	MD1			Massey Aerodrome		4
Mitchellville	W00			Freeway Airport		
Ridgely	RJD		KRJD	Gooden Airpark		
Salisbury	1N5			Bennett Airport		
Stevensville	3W3			Kentmorr Airpark		
Westminster	2W2			Clearview Airpark		
				**Other military airports**		
Aberdeen Proving Ground	APG	APG	KAPG	Phillips Army Airfield		
Aberdeen Proving Ground	EDG	EDG	KEDG	Weide Army Airfield		
Camp Springs	ADW	ADW	KADW	Andrews Air Force Base		4,187
Patuxent River	NHK	NHK	KNHK	NAS Patuxent River (Trapnell Field)		55
St. Inigoes	NUI		KNUI	NOLF Webster		
				**Notable private-use airports**		
Eldersburg	2MD5			Hoby Wolf Airport		
				**Notable former airports**		
Laurel	~~W18~~			Suburban Airport (closed 2017)		
Perry Hall	~~1W2~~			Baltimore Airpark (closed 2001)		

== See also ==
- Essential Air Service
- Maryland World War II Army Airfields
- Wikipedia:WikiProject Aviation/Airline destination lists: North America#Maryland
