= Aviation in Washington, D.C. =

- Aviation in the United States
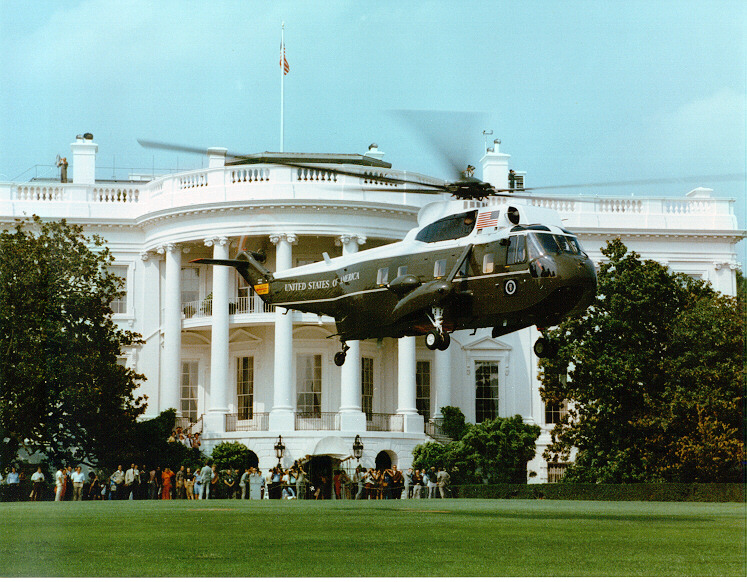
- Marine One taking off from the South Lawn at the White House

Airports
- Commercial – primary: 0
- Commercial – non-primary: 0
- General aviation: 0
- Other public-use airports: 0
- Military and other airports: 2

First flight
- June 17, 1861

The United States capital, Washington, D.C., has been the site of several events in the nation's history of aviation, beginning from the time of the American Civil War, often for the purpose of promoting the adoption of new aeronautical technologies by the government. It has also been home to several governmental and civilian aircraft manufacturers and aviation organizations, and several aerospace contractors.

== Events ==
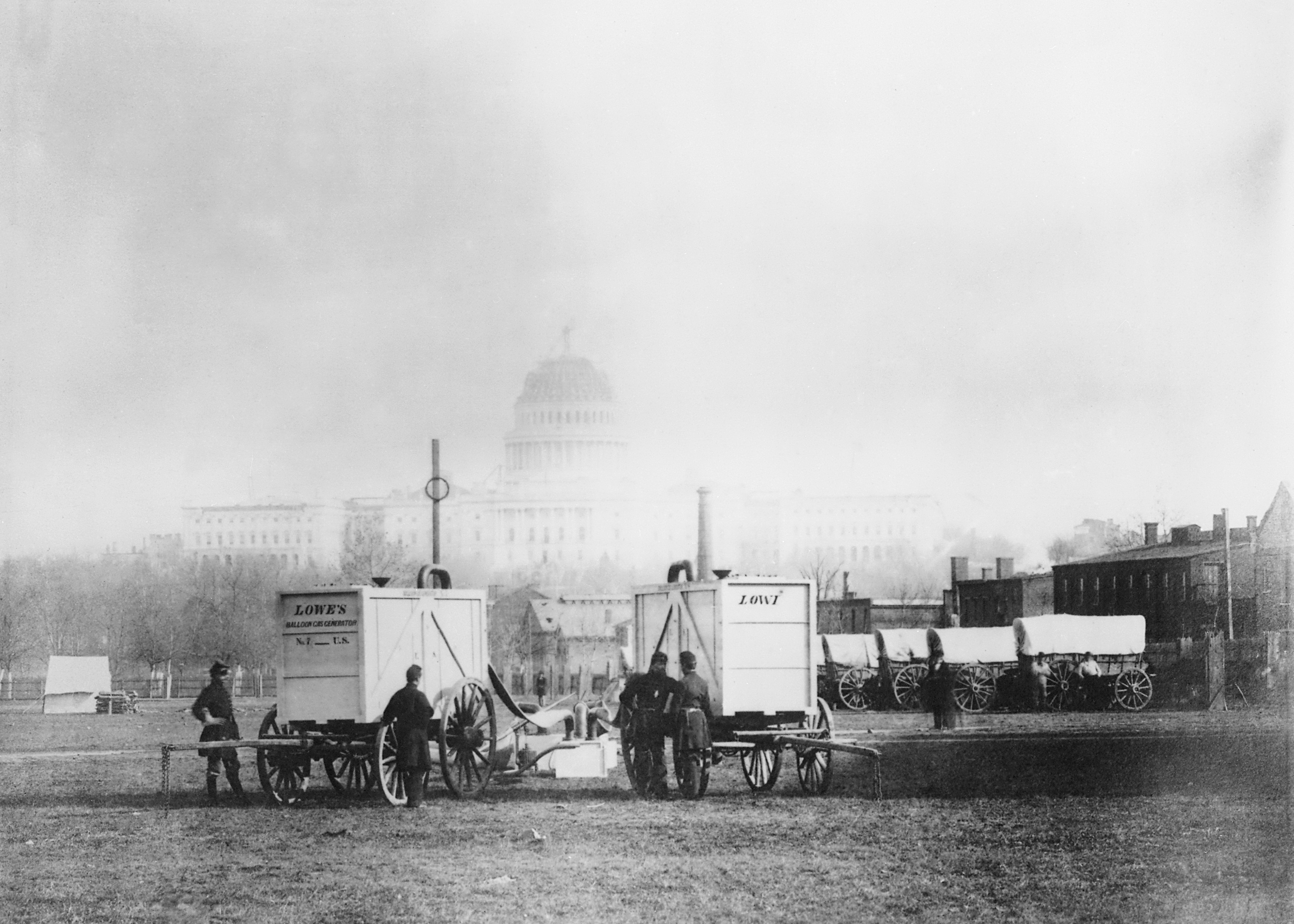
Thaddeus S. C. Lowe's gas generators in 1861

The first aeronautical event was the tethered demonstration flight of a hot air balloon, the Enterprise, by Thaddeus S. C. Lowe to Abraham Lincoln. The flight included the demonstration of a balloon-to-ground telegraph, resulting in Lowe being appointed to the newly created position of Chief Aeronaut.

=== Timeline of events ===
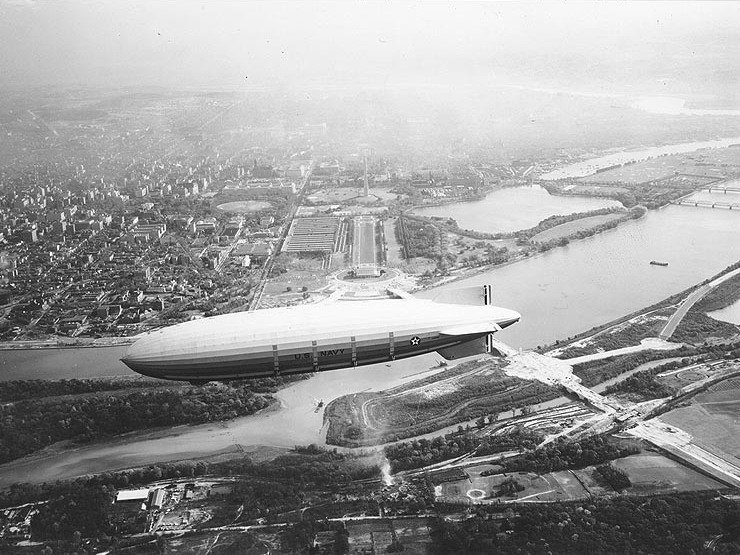
Washington, D.C., as a backdrop to the USS Akron in 1931 or 1932.

- 1861: Professor Lowe demonstrates hot air balloons for Abraham Lincoln
- 1910: Claude Grahame-White lands a Farman biplane on the street between the White House and State, War and Navy Department buildings on October 11
- 1911: On July 13, Harry Nelson Atwood flies circles around the Washington Monument. The next day he lands on the White House lawn, accepting a gold medal of the Aero Club of Washington presented by President William Howard Taft.
- 1913: Godfrey de C. Chevalier flew a Curtiss Flying Boat from the Washington Navy Yard for the longest of the time all-over-water flight, with a route down the Potomac, and up the Chesapeake Bay to Annapolis, Maryland of 169 miles.
- 1921: The first blimp filled with helium flew from Hampton Roads Virginia to Washington, D.C., on its maiden voyage.
- 1931: Pilot James G. Ray landed a Pitcairn PCA-2 autogyro on the south lawn of the White House.
- 1936: The Autogiro Company of America AC-35 Roadable aircraft was landed in downtown Washington to demonstrate to the Bureau of Air Commerce.
- 1939: Pilot Francisco Sarabia was killed in the crash of the Gee Bee Q.E.D. at Bolling Airfield after setting record flights to America from Mexico.
- 1974: U.S. Army private Robert Preston takes off in a stolen Army Bell UH-1 Iroquois in Maryland, and flies it to Washington, D.C., where he hovers close to the Lincoln Memorial and the Washington Monument and over the South Lawn of the White House. After looping back through Maryland and into D.C. with police helicopters in pursuit, he lands on the South Lawn of the White House. Preston enrolled in the Army to become a helicopter pilot, but after failing to pass his training course he was instead given the occupation of helicopter mechanic for the rest of his 4-year enlistment. Preston believed that this situation was unfair and later said that he stole the helicopter to show his skill as a pilot. After landing, he was arrested and sentenced to 1 year in prison, 6 months of which was time served.
- 1982: On January 13 an Air Florida 737 crashed into the Potomac river. The rescues performed by the helicopters of the United States Park Police were shown live on television.
- 2001: The September 11 attacks caused the formation of the Washington Air Defense Identification Zone, temporarily closing, then permanently restricting air operations around Washington, D.C.
- 2015: Pilot Doug Hughes lands an autogyro on the Capital Mall and is arrested on federal charges 84 years after James G. Ray demonstrates an autogyro landing on the mall receiving a Collier Trophy for safety from president Herbert Hoover.
- 2015: On May 8, formations of World War II vintage military aircraft flew through Washington, D.C.'s restricted airspace to honor the 70th anniversary of Victory in Europe Day.
- 2015: On May 15, the FAA markets Washington, D.C., as a "No Drone Zone".

== Aircraft manufacturers ==
- Christmas Aeroplane Company 1910–1912 founded in Washington, D.C., to build designs of Dr. Christmas.
- Gyro Motor Company 1909– maker of early rotary engines.
- Rex Smith Aeroplane Company 1910–1916, was headquartered in Washington, D.C., with production in nearby College Park, Maryland.
- Washington Aeroplane Company maker of the Christmas Biplane, and Columbia monoplane powered with a Gyro Motor Company rotary engine.
- Boeing, known for designing and manufacturing both commercial and defense aircraft, is headquartered in nearby Arlington, Virginia.

== Aerospace ==
- American Propeller Manufacturing Company was founded in 1909 and moved to Baltimore in 1912. The company made Paragon wooden propellers.

Most large Defense Contractors choose to have branch offices in Washington, D.C., for access to policy and budgetary decision makers.

== Airports ==
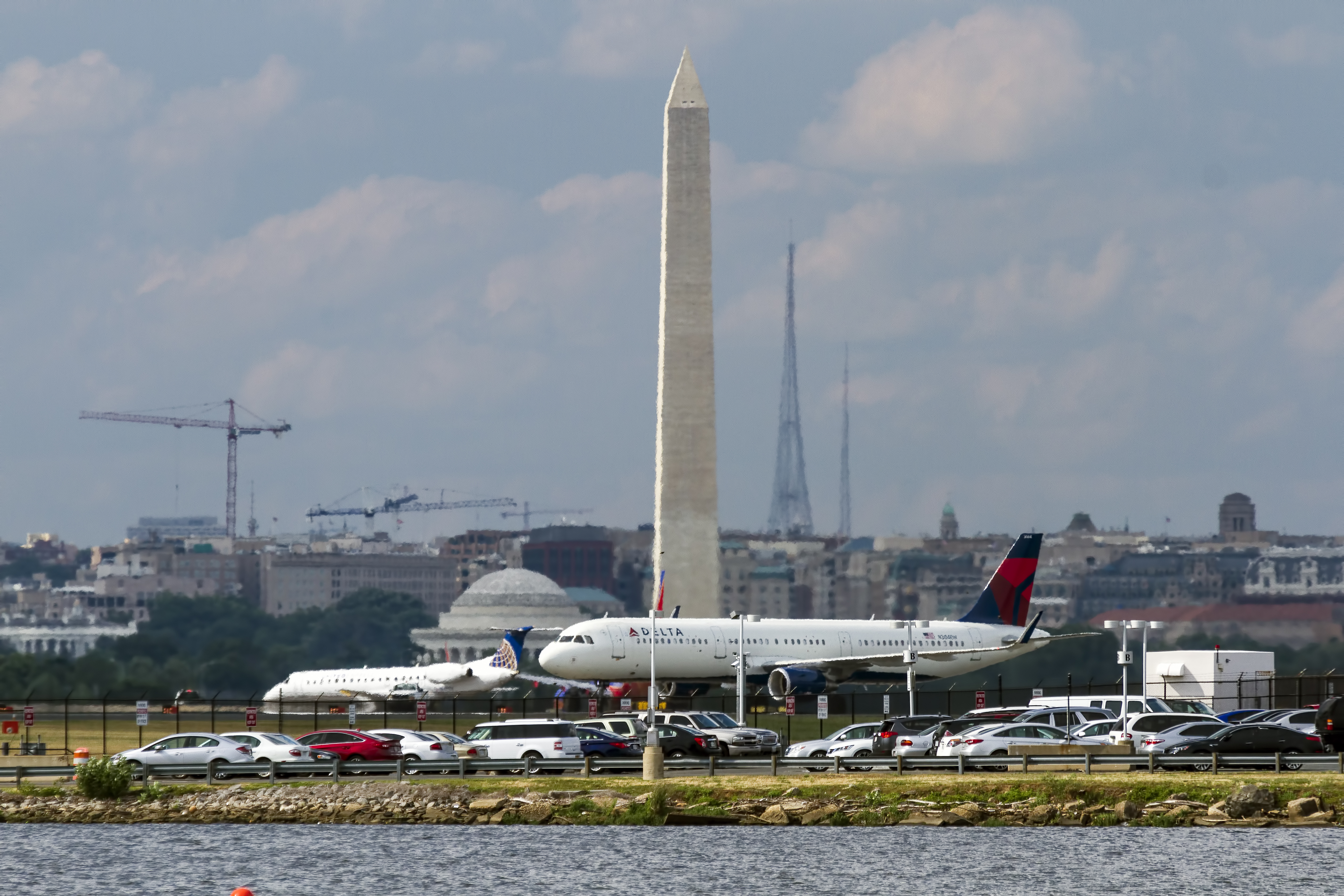
Ronald Reagan Washington National Airport in Crystal City, Virginia in June 2017 with Washington, D.C. visible in the background

Washington, D.C., does not have any public airports within its boundaries. The city is serviced by Dulles International Airport in Dulles, Virginia; Ronald Reagan Washington National Airport in Crystal City, Virginia; and Baltimore/Washington International Airport in Anne Arundel County, Maryland. Dulles is the primary international airport for the Washington metropolitan region while Reagan National is the primary domestic airport.

Washington, D.C., has 13 listed heliports.

- List of heliports in Washington, D.C.

== Organizations ==
- The Aero Club of Washington was founded on 23 January 1909, with Thomas Francis Walsh as president. ACW merged with the National Aeronautic Association in 1929.
- Air Transport Association is headquartered in Washington, D.C., represents the airline industry.
- American Institute of Aeronautics and Astronautics is a professional society in the field of aerospace engineering.
- The Aviation Institute of U.S.A was founded in Washington, D.C., by Walter Hinton, pilot of the Curtiss NC "NC-4", the first aircraft to make a transatlantic flight, in 1919.
- Association for Unmanned Vehicle Systems International moved to Washington in 1982.

== Government and military ==
=== Government ===
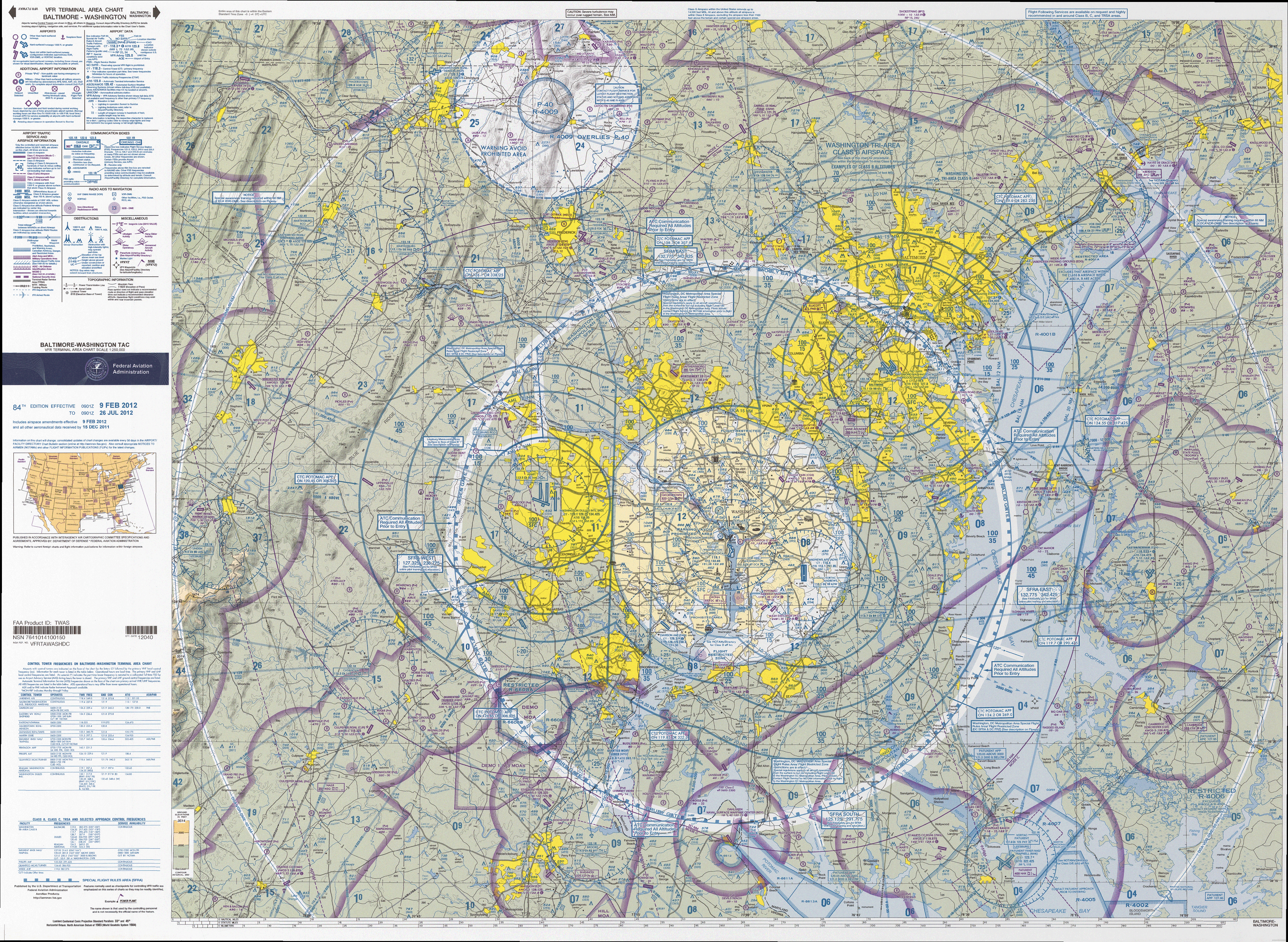
Aviation chart showing restricted airspace in the Washington, D.C., area.

As the capital of the United States of America, Washington, D.C., is the headquarters for many agencies that oversee aviation, influence aviation policy, and use aviation resources.

Government flight operations

- All flight operations in Washington, D.C., are conducted within FAA oversight.
- The White House lawn serves as a heliport for Marine One.
- Anacostia Park is the home to the United States Park Police aviation unit since 1976.

Aviation related government agencies headquartered in Washington, D.C.

- United States Department of Transportation is a federal Cabinet department of the United States government concerned with transportation.
- Federal Aviation Administration is an agency of the United States Department of Transportation with authority to regulate and oversee all aspects of civil aviation in the U.S.
- National Transportation Safety Board is an independent U.S. government investigative agency responsible for civil transportation accident investigation.
- National Aeronautics and Space Administration (NASA) is an executive branch agency of the United States government, responsible for the nation's civilian space program and aeronautics and aerospace research

=== Military ===
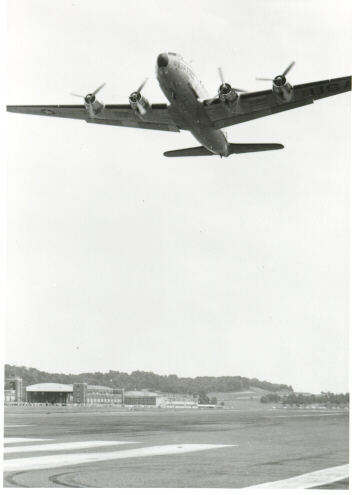
Last flight out of Bolling Airfield in 1962.

- Bolling Air Force Base opened on the first of July 1918. The last fixed wing flight at the airfield (and Washington, D.C.) was on 1 July 1962. In 2010, Bolling Air Force Base and Naval Support Facility Anacostia were merged into Joint Base Anacostia Bolling. The Naval Support Facility Anacostia operates a large heliport facility to support HMX-1 operations such as Marine One.
- Washington Navy Yard was the location of the first shipboard catapult in 1912, and featured a wind tunnel in 1916. It was the test site for torpedo-carrying aircraft prototypes of the Curtiss CT-1, Stout ST-1, Fokker FT-1 and Blackburn Swift F.
- United States Naval Research Laboratory is the corporate research laboratory for the United States Navy and the United States Marine Corps and conducts a program of scientific research and development.

College Park Airfield, College Park, MD. Wright Brothers experimental aircraft development.

== Museums ==
- National Air and Space Museum is part of the Smithsonian Institution formed in 1946. It features some of aviation's most influential aircraft including the Wright Flyer, Spirit of St. Louis, and the Apollo 11 command module.

College Park Aviation Museum, College Park, MD.

== Film and media ==
Washington, D.C., is a popular backdrop for aircraft photography.

== See also ==
Transportation in Washington, D.C.
