= Rex Smith Biplane =

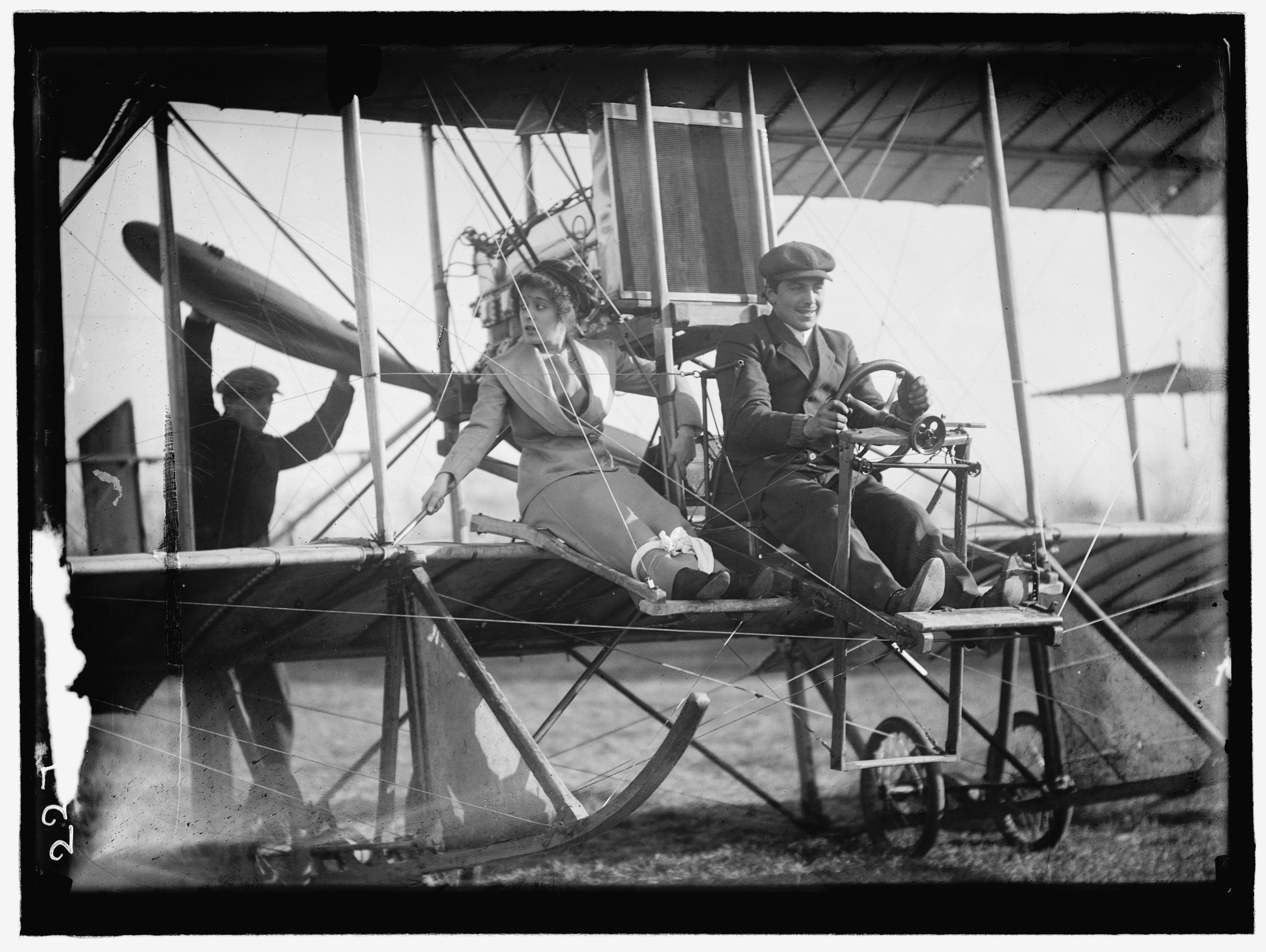

General information
- Type: Biplane
- National origin: United States of America
- Manufacturer: Rex Smith Aeroplane Company

History
- Introduction date: 1910
- First flight: 1910
- Developed from: Curtiss Pusher

The Rex Smith Biplane was a pioneering biplane based mostly on designs of Glen Curtiss. It was built and demonstrated at College Park, Maryland, at the same airfield that the Wright Brothers trained pilots using their aircraft for the U.S. Army Signal Corps just north of Washington, D.C. This followed the initial demonstration at Fort Myer, Virginia, in 1908 and 1909, when the U.S. Army Signal Corps accepted the Wright Flyer in July 1909. Both the Wright Brothers and Curtiss continued to demonstrate their aircraft at the College Park Airport.

== Operational history ==
At a 1911 display in Washington, D.C., of the Smith biplane, a large crowd gathered to watch the motor started indoors, kicking dust throughout the building. On April 13, the biplane demonstrated wireless air-to-ground communications at College Park. On April 15, test pilot Tony Jannus attempted a take off from the Potomac River with new pontoons attached to the landing skids. The plane plowed into the water, nearly drowning Jannus. By the end of the year, the aircraft had demonstrated 137 flights, including takeoffs and landings during snowstorms.

== Variants ==
An aircraft was developed with an airfoil that tapered from four feet thick to nearly flat at the wingtips. The aircraft used wing warping tips rather than ailerons. It was tested with a Hall-Scott engine by test pilot Paul Peck. A Berliner Rotary was also considered for the design.

== Specifications (Rex Smith Biplane) ==
Data from Aeronautics

General characteristics

- Capacity: 1-3
- Wingspan: 40 ft (12 m) span later reduced to 32 feet for speed
- Empty weight: 875 lb (397 kg)
- Powerplant: 1 × Emerson 2 cycle, six cylinder, 100 hp (75 kW)
- Propellers: 2-bladed Paragon, 9 ft (2.7 m) diameter

Performance
