= Clearview =

Clearview or clear view may refer to:

== Entertainment ==
- Clearview (album), the seventh studio album by the Finnish rock band Poets of the Fall

== Companies ==
- Clearview AI, a facial recognition company
- Clearview Cinemas, a chain of movie theatres within the New York metropolitan area that is owned by Bow Tie Cinemas

== Places ==
=== Canada ===
- Clearview, Oakville, Ontario
- Clearview, Ontario

=== United States ===
==== Inhabited places ====
- Clearview, Queens, a neighborhood in Queens, New York City surrounded by Auburndale, Beechhurst, and Bay Terrace.
- Clearview, Oklahoma
- Clearview, Philadelphia, a neighborhood in Southwest Philadelphia, Pennsylvania.
- Clearview, Virginia
- Clearview, Washington
- Clearview, West Virginia

==== Other places in the United States ====
- Clearview High School (Lorain, Ohio)
- Clearview (Falmouth, Virginia), an 18th-century home
- Clearview Airpark, an airport located in Westminster, Maryland

=== Other places ===
- Clearview, South Australia, Australia
- Clearview Primary School, Rolleston, New Zealand

== Transportation ==
- Clearview Expressway, a short expressway in Queens, New York
- Clearview (typeface), font family for traffic signs
- Clear view screen, a device used to keep rain or snow off of a vehicle windshield
