= List of airports in or around Washington =

List of airports in Washington may refer to:

- List of airports in Washington (state)
- List of airports serving Washington, D.C.
