= W32 =

W32 may refer to:

- Windows API, the core set of APIs available in Microsoft Windows
- Empire Woodland, a British Empire ship
- Hansa-Brandenburg W.32, a First World War prototype fighter floatplane
- Kita-Nagayama Station, in Asahikawa, Hokkaido, Japan
- Washington Executive Airport, in Clinton, Maryland, United States
- Westsail 32, a sailboat
