= DMW =

DMW may refer to:

- Deutsche Medizinische Wochenschrift, a German medical journal
- Davido Music Worldwide, a Nigerian record label, often abbreviated to DMW.
- DMW Motorcycles, UK
- Carroll County Regional Airport, an airport with FAA 3-letter code DMW.
- Drever, McCusker, Woomble, three Scottish musicians who collaborated on the album Before the Ruin
- Department of Migrant Workers, an executive department of the Philippine government
