= CGE =

CGE may refer to:

== Companies ==
- Canadian General Electric
- Compagnie Générale des Eaux, French company renamed Vivendi SA in 1998, merged with Canal+ and Seagram in 2000 to become Vivendi Universal
- Compagnie Générale d'Electricité, French company which became part of Alcatel
- Compagnia Generale di Elettricità S.p.A., former Italian subsidiary of American company General Electric
- Czech Games Edition, a Czech boardgames publisher

== Education ==
- Conférence des grandes écoles (CGE), France
- Center for Gifted Education, Virginia

== Entertainment ==
- Classic Gaming Expo, a video game convention started in 1999

== Politics ==
- Conservative Group for Europe, advocacy group in the United Kingdom, replaced by the Conservative European Forum in 2021

== Sciences ==
- Caudal Ganglionic Eminence, in neuroscience
- Computable general equilibrium models, in economics

== Places ==
- The IATA code for Cambridge–Dorchester Airport in Cambridge, Maryland
