= Washington, D.C., Special Flight Rules Area =

Restriction on air traffic around the capital city of the United States

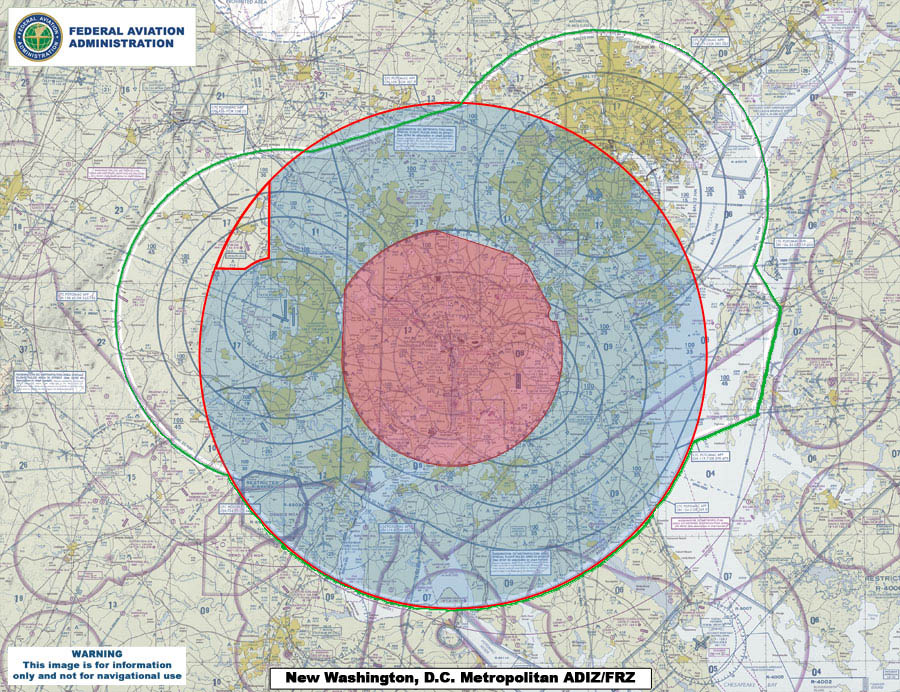
The new Washington ADIZ (red line) compared to the old ADIZ (green line).

The Washington, D.C., Special Flight Rules Area (also known as the DC SFRA (Note: Pronounced siff-ra.)) is a circular area around Washington, D.C. in which additional flight requirements apply. An air defense identification zone (ADIZ) has existed since February 10, 2003, around the Baltimore-Washington Metropolitan Area to restrict air traffic near Washington, D.C.

The ADIZ was established as a precursor to the US invasion of Iraq in 2003. It has been erroneously connected to the September 11 attacks as a temporary measure to prevent further attacks. It was made permanent in 2008.

Despite efforts by the Federal Aviation Administration to inform pilots of the ADIZ, there are still many unauthorized incursions by unsuspecting pilots. A pilot who violates the boundaries may be intercepted by military aircraft and escorted to the nearest airport.

== Creation ==
The ADIZ (now known by its components, the Flight Restricted Zone and Special Flight Rules Area) was created by the FAA in response to demands by a working group that became formalized as the National Capital Region Coordination Center. The U.S. Congress has never legitimized these restrictions, and any consideration of opposing the Executive Branch's actions became politically unpalatable in the wake of two mishaps that led to the evacuation of the Capitol. One involved a plane carrying Ernie Fletcher, the governor of Kentucky, which led to an evacuation in 2004. The other, almost a year later, involved a Cessna 150 flown by a student pilot accompanied by a pilot who was not familiar with the ADIZ rules, using an outdated chart.

== Location ==
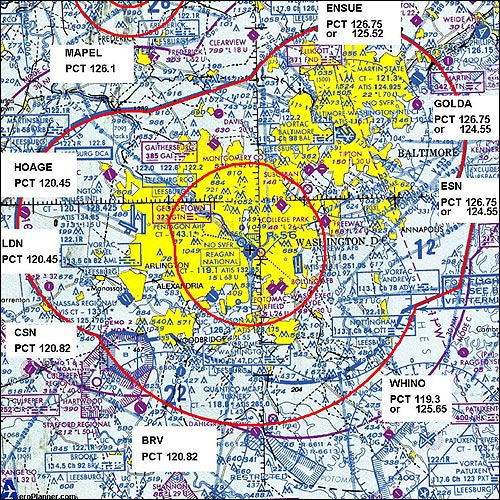
The old official entry and exit reference points for the ADIZ.

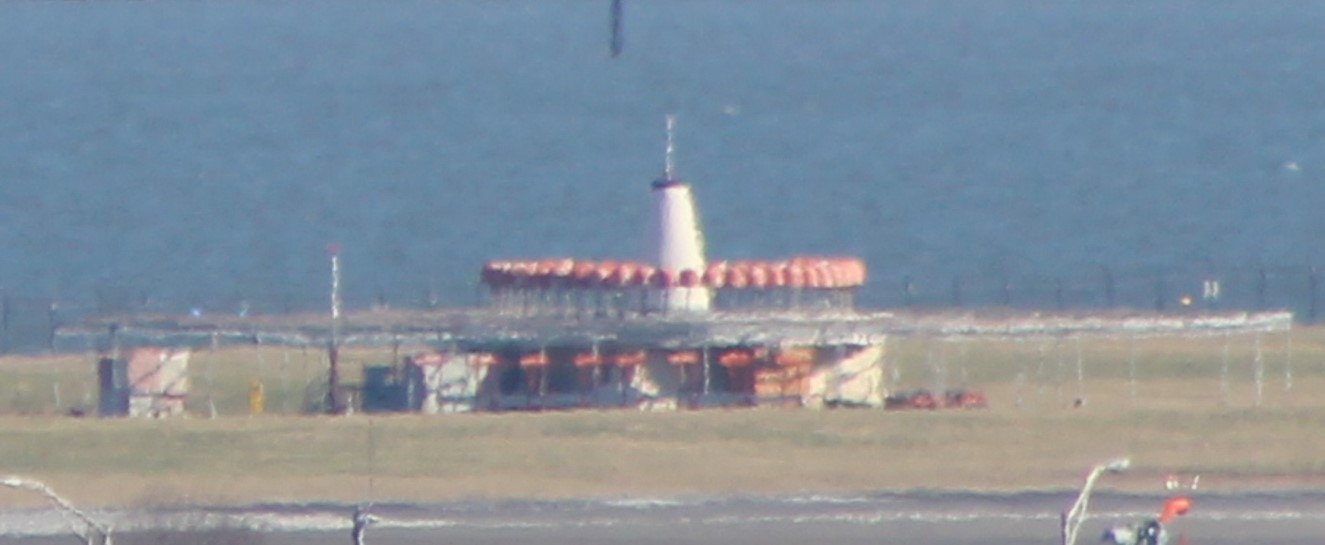
Photo of the DCA VOR/DME Ground Station located on the Ronald Reagan National Airport.

The original Washington ADIZ was roughly co-extensive with the Class B airspace around Washington. On August 30, 2007, the dimensions of the ADIZ were changed to a 30-nautical-mile-radius (35 mi; 56 km) circle centered on the Ronald Reagan Washington National Airport (DCA) VOR/DME (located at 38°51′34″N 77°2′11″W), with a small triangular cutout for Leesburg Executive Airport (JYO). This change reduced the size of the ADIZ by 1,800 sq mi (4,700 km^{2}) and removed 33 airports from its coverage.

=== Flight Restricted Zone ===
Within the ADIZ is an even more sensitive zone designated the Washington, D.C. Metropolitan Area Flight Restricted Zone (DC FRZ). The DC FRZ extends approximately 13–15 nmi (15–17 mi; 24–28 km) around the DCA VOR/DME. Flight within the FRZ is restricted to governmental, certain scheduled commercial and a limited set of waivered flights. Two general aviation airports (known as the "Maryland 3" or the "DC 3") are located inside the DC FRZ: College Park Airport (CGS) and Potomac Airport (VKX). Washington Executive/Hyde Field (W32) closed permanently in 2022.

== Public opposition ==
Pilots' groups, led by the Aircraft Owners and Pilots Association (AOPA), have argued that the ADIZ is unnecessary and has a harmful effect on the economy of small airports and aviation-related businesses in and near the ADIZ. Pilots involved in law enforcement have described the ADIZ as a "major, unnecessary burden on pilots and air traffic controllers with almost no increased security benefit." AOPA and other groups are hoping to persuade Congress to lift or ease the ADIZ restrictions from Washington airspace – or at the very least to dramatically improve its operational aspects.

In 2006, the FAA issued a Notice of Proposed Rulemaking (NPRM) docket number 17005 concerning making the temporary rules permanent. Over 20,000 responses were received, the vast majority of them in opposition to making the temporary rules permanent. There were two public hearings held by the FAA in the Washington, D.C., area on the NPRM. All speakers were opposed to making the NPRM permanent. The FAA published transcripts of the public hearings. The transcripts were later withdrawn from the public as they were alleged to contain Sensitive Security Information, but were returned following review.

== Subsequent changes ==
On August 30, 2007, the FAA implemented new rules for air traffic controllers and issued revised NOTAMs for pilots flying in the ADIZ. Although the NOTAMs and FAA procedures state that no radar services will be provided to pilots unless requested, air traffic controllers at Potomac TRACON are providing such services. This is due to a memorandum from the Potomac TRACON Air Traffic Manager to air traffic controllers stating that a certain paragraph (2–1–2) of the Air Traffic Control handbook (7110.65) is still applicable when providing ATC Security Services.

Effective February 9, 2009, any pilots flying VFR within a 60-nautical-mile (110 km) radius centered on the ADIZ are required to complete training about the ADIZ. This training can be completed online through a course called "Navigating the New DC ADIZ" (now "DC Special Flight Rules Area"). Pilots may also complete the required training by attending a seminar offered at a Flight Standards District Office. Pilots must obtain a certificate which proves that the training has been completed. This certificate is not required to be carried with the pilot, but must be produced when requested from law enforcement or other agencies. Pilots flying IFR are not subject to this requirement.

On February 17, 2009, the status of the ADIZ was scheduled to change from a temporary flight restriction to a permanent special flight rules area. On February 6, 2009, White House officials declined a request to postpone the implementation.

In February 2012, the FAA Modernization and Reform Act of 2012 required a joint plan to be submitted in 180 days by the Administrator of the Federal Aviation Administration, in consultation with the Secretaries of Homeland Security and Defense.

The plan shall outline specific changes to the D.C. Metropolitan Area Special Flight Rules Area that will decrease operational impacts and improve general aviation access to airports in the National Capital Region that are currently impacted by the zone.

In June 2014, Leesburg airport traffic was granted authority to perform local traffic pattern practice without a SFRA plan filed while operating under tower control without departing the pattern.

== Laser warning system ==
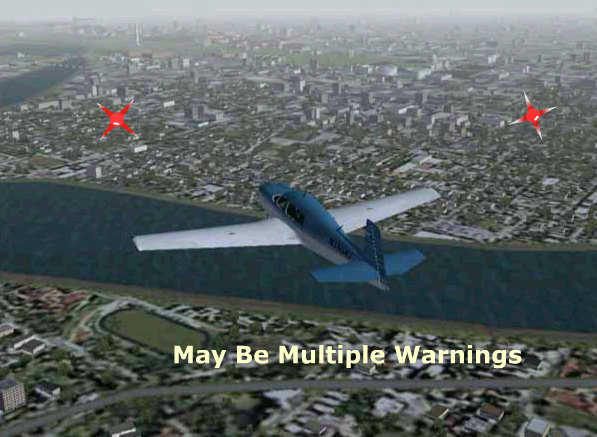
This is a graphic to show what the NORAD Laser Warning System would look like.

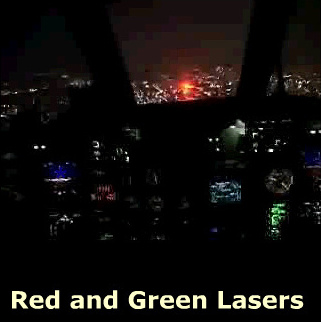
This is what the NORAD Laser Warning System would look like in an aircraft that entered restricted airspace.

In May 2005, NORAD started using a laser warning system to warn pilots that cross into restricted airspace. The bright laser beams, which flash red-red-green, are easily seen, even during daylight. The laser beams can be seen 15 to 20 miles (24 to 32 km) away. Other pilots are unlikely to see the lasers because, when activated, the directional beams are pointed at the aircraft that has crossed into restricted airspace. Multiple lasers could be activated. These lasers do not harm the eyes of aircrew or passengers.

== See also ==
- North Warning System
- Distant Early Warning Line
- Aviation in Washington, D.C.
