= FRZ =

FRZ may refer to:

- Fritzlar Air Base, in Hesse, Germany
- Frizzled, a protein
- Flight Restricted Zone, part of the Washington, DC Metropolitan Area Special Flight Rules Area
