= Lee Airport =

- IATA: ANP; ICAO: KANP; FAA LID: ANP

Summary
- Airport type: Public
- Owner: Lee Airport Authority
- Serves: Annapolis, Maryland
- Location: Edgewater, Maryland
- Elevation AMSL: 34 ft / 10 m
- Coordinates: 38°56′34″N 076°34′06″W

Map
- Interactive map of Lee Airport

Runways
Direction	Length		Surface
Direction	ft	m	Surface
12/30	2,505	764	Asphalt

Statistics (2023)
- Aircraft operations (year ending 3/29/2023): 11,646
- Based aircraft: 69
- Source: Federal Aviation Administration

Lee Airport (IATA: ANP, ICAO: KANP, FAA LID: ANP) is a public use airport located in Anne Arundel County, Maryland, United States. The airport is five nautical miles (9 km) southwest of the central business district of Annapolis. It is privately owned by the Lee Airport Authority in Edgewater, Maryland.

== Facilities and aircraft ==
Lee Airport covers an area of 79 acres (32 ha) at an elevation of 34 feet (10 m) above mean sea level. It has one asphalt paved runway designated 12/30 which measures 2,505 by 48 feet (764 x 15 m).

For the 12-month period ending March 29, 2023, the airport had 11,646 aircraft operations, an average of 32 per day: 97% general aviation and 3% military. At that time there were 69 aircraft based at this airport: 67 single-engine, and 2 multi-engine.

== See also ==
- List of airports in Maryland
