= Easton Airport (Maryland) =

Easton Airport Newnam Field
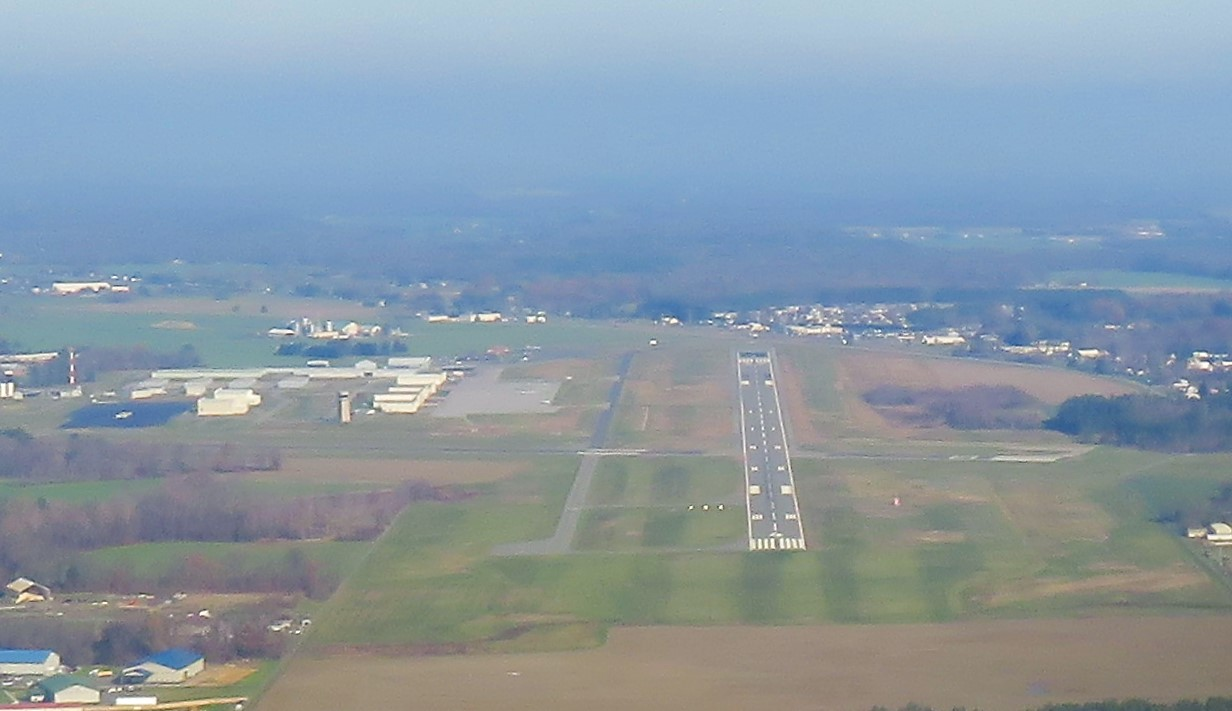
- IATA: ESN; ICAO: KESN; FAA LID: ESN

Summary
- Airport type: Public
- Owner: Talbot County
- Serves: Easton, Maryland
- Elevation AMSL: 72 ft (22 m)
- Coordinates: 38°48′15″N 076°04′08″W
- Website: www.EastonAirport.com

Map
- Location of airport in Maryland

Runways
Direction	Length		Surface
Direction	ft	m	Surface
4/22	5,500	1,676	Asphalt
15/33	4,003	1,220	Asphalt

Statistics (2022)
- Aircraft operations (year ending 6/27/2022): 73,201
- Based aircraft: 180
- Source: FAA and airport web site

Easton Airport (IATA: ESN, ICAO: KESN, FAA LID: ESN), also known as Easton/Newnam Field, is a county-owned, public-use airport located two nautical miles (4 km, or 2.5 miles) north of the central business district of Easton, a town in Talbot County, Maryland, United States.

== Facilities and aircraft ==
Easton Airport covers an area of 615 acres (249 ha) at an elevation of 72 feet (22 m) above mean sea level. It has two asphalt paved runways: 4/22 measuring 5,500 x 100 ft (1,676 x 30 m) and 15/33 measuring 4,003 x 100 ft. (1,220 x 30 m).

There are precision approaches on runway 4 and 22. Runway 4 uses an ILS approach while runway 22 uses a GPS or NDB approach. All four runways use PAPI precision approach lights to help guide pilots on their final approach on landing. As of late 2007, an Air traffic control tower has been built on field, due to the increasing number of aircraft at Easton Airport. Easton is now a Class D (Delta) controlled airport with a ceiling of 2,600 feet.

For the 12-month period ending June 27, 2022, the airport had 73,201 aircraft operations, an average of 200 per day: 76% general aviation, 19% military, and 5% air taxi. At that time there were 180 aircraft based at this airport: 135 single-engine, 26 multi-engine, 14 jet and 2 helicopter, and 3 gliders.

On field services include: 100LL and Jet A fuel, aircraft rental, aircraft sales, aircraft maintenance, aerial photography, flight school, charter flights, car rental, oxygen and T-hangars.

A Maryland State Police Aviation Command helicopter, Trooper 6, is based at Easton Airport.

== See also ==
- List of airports in Maryland
