= List of airports serving Washington, D.C. =

Washington, D.C., the capital of the United States, has no public airports within its boundaries. However, several airports serve Washington, D.C. Some airports are defunct, and some are still active. Some of these airports are public (owned and operated by a government or governmental authority), some are public use (privately owned, but open to all aircraft), and some are private (privately owned, and only aircraft approved by the private owner may use the airfield).

== Active airports ==
- Ronald Reagan Washington National Airport (IATA: DCA), a public airport serving Washington, D.C., which opened in 1941
- College Park Airport (IATA: CGS), a public airport serving the College Park/Riverdale Park/University Park area, is the oldest public airport still operating in the United States
- Stafford Regional Airport (FAA: RMN), a public airport serving Stafford, Virginia
- Baltimore/Washington International Airport (IATA: BWI), a public airport serving the Baltimore-Washington, D.C., combined statistical area
- Dulles International Airport (IATA: IAD), a public airport in Dulles, Virginia, serving the Washington D.C. metropolitan area

== Defunct airports ==
- Hoover Field, a now-defunct airport which served Washington, D.C., from 1925 to 1933 (its merger with Washington Airport)
- Washington Airport, a now-defunct airport which served Washington, D.C., from 1927 to 1933 (its merger with Hoover Field)
- Washington-Hoover Airport, a now-defunct airport which served Washington, D.C., from 1933 to 1941
- Washington Executive Airport (FAA: W32), a public use airport near Clinton, Maryland, served until 2022

== See also ==
- List of heliports in Washington, D.C.
