= Frederick Municipal Airport (Maryland) =

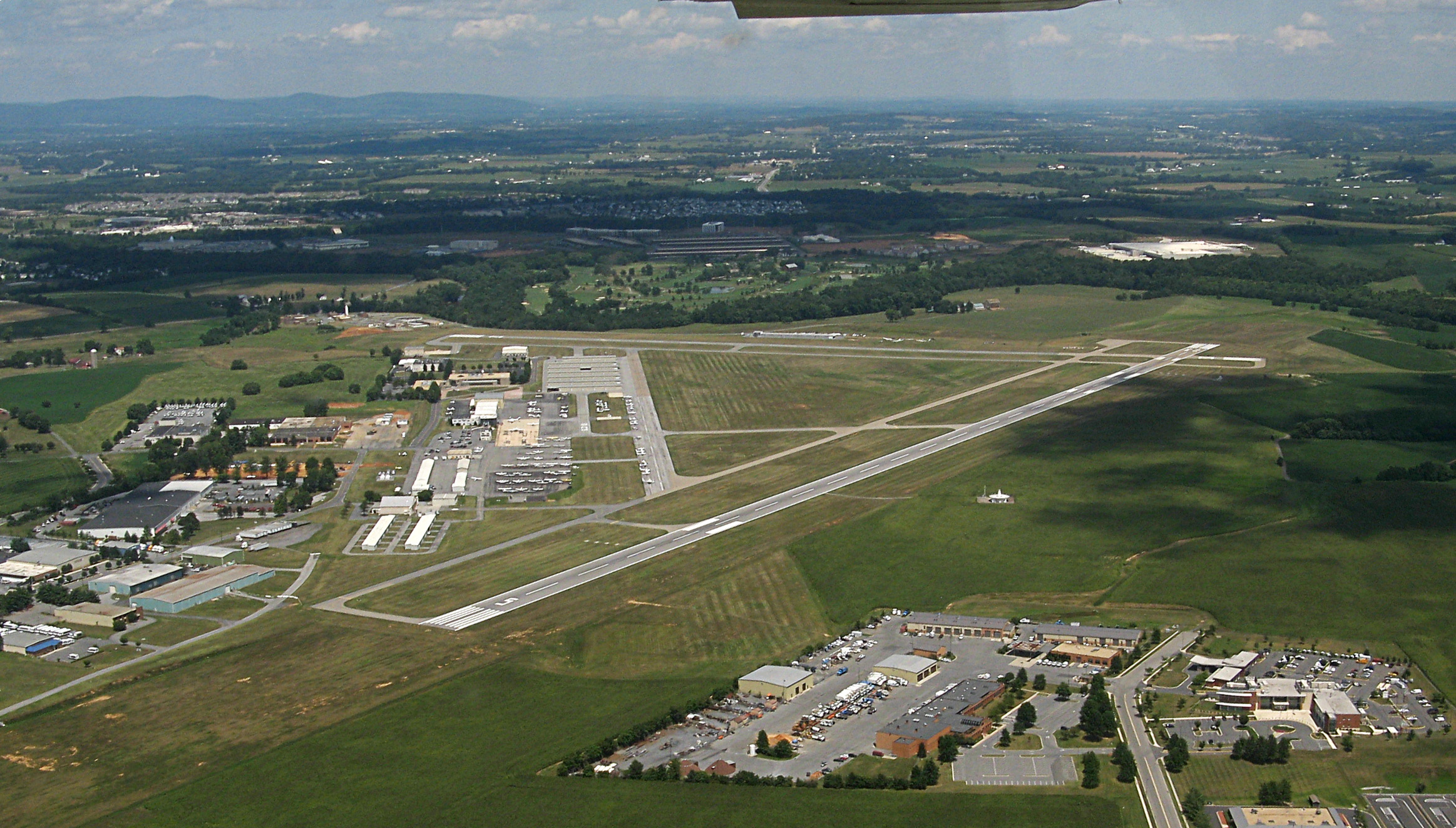
- Frederick Municipal Airport (FDK)
- IATA: FDK; ICAO: KFDK; FAA LID: FDK

Summary
- Airport type: Public
- Owner: City of Frederick
- Location: Frederick, Maryland
- Elevation AMSL: 303 ft (92 m)
- Coordinates: 39°25′03″N 077°22′28″W
- Website: http://www.cityoffrederick.com/index.aspx?nid=152

Map
- Location of airport in Maryland / United States FDK (the United States)

Runways
Direction	Length		Surface
Direction	ft	m	Surface
5/23	5,819	1,591	Asphalt concrete
12/30	3,600	1,097	Asphalt
- Source: Federal Aviation Administration, City of Frederick Economic Development

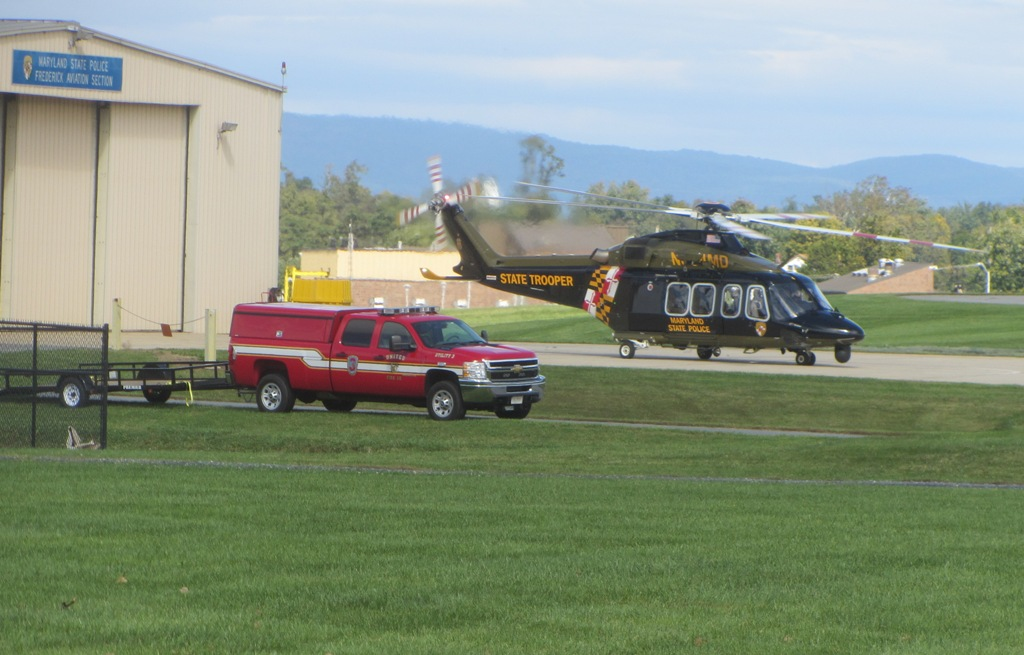
Maryland State Police Frederick Aviation Section

Frederick Municipal Airport (IATA: FDK, ICAO: KFDK, FAA LID: FDK) is a public airport located in the city of Frederick, in Frederick County, Maryland, United States. This airport is publicly owned by the City of Frederick.

Frederick Municipal Airport (FDK) is classified as a general aviation airport. According to analysis, FDK experienced approximately 129,000 operations in 2004 with an expected increase to about 165,000 by 2025.

== History ==
Frederick Municipal Airport's construction began on March 26, 1946. It replaced Detrick Field, which would become Fort Detrick and lose its aeronautical function. The airport opened on April 17, 1946, with the arrival of a Stinson aircraft, although the airport was not open for general use until the grading and paving of the runways completed later. The airport was dedicated on May 1, 1949. At the dedication ceremony, two plaques were unveiled; one honored Frederick County residents who served their country in World War II, and the other honored Lieutenant William T. Delaplaine III, the first Frederick County pilot to lose his life in World War II.

The airport became the home of the Experimental Aircraft Association east coast fly-in in 1970.

== Facilities ==
In October 2010, Frederick Municipal Airport received $4.8 million from the American Recovery and Reinvestment Act of 2009 to build and staff a control tower at the airport. Work commenced in October 2010, and an air traffic control tower, with accompanying Class D airspace, was commissioned on May 1, 2012.

=== Runways ===
FDK maintains two paved runways: the primary runway, Runway 5-23, which is 5,220 feet in length and 100 feet in width, and Runway 12-30, which is 3,600 feet in length and 75 feet in width.

Plans for the airfield include upgrading the existing runway 5/23 to 6,000 feet in length, 12/30 to 3,750 feet, and adding a third turf runway with 2,400 feet. In keeping up with increased growth of corporate and personal aircraft in the Frederick area, the airport has also planned for increased hangar storage.

Frederick Municipal Airport currently covers an area of 616 acres (249 ha) and contains two runways:

- Runway 5/23: 5,819 by 100 feet (1,774 m × 30 m), surface: asphalt concrete
- Runway 12/30: 3,600 by 75 feet (1,097 m × 23 m), surface: asphalt concrete

=== On field ===
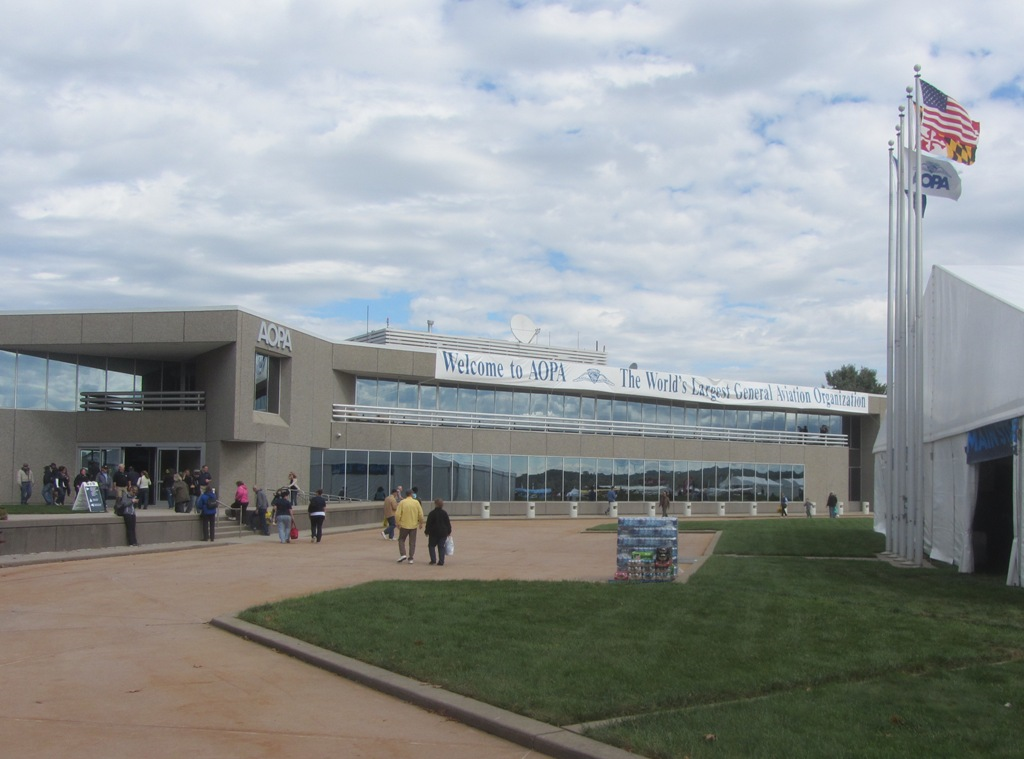
AOPA headquarters

- Aircraft Owners and Pilots Association (AOPA) headquarters
- Fuel: 100LL, Jet-A
- Aircraft sales
- Aircraft maintenance
- Oxygen
- Pilot lounge and supplies
- Airways Inn restaurant
- Frederick Flight Center (flight training and rental)
- Bravo Flight Training (Flight Training and Rental)
- Helicopter Flight school and rental

== Incidents ==
On October 23, 2014, a Cirrus SR22 on descent struck a helicopter near the airport, killing all three aboard the aircraft involved. A National Transportation Safety Board report primarily blamed pilot error but noted the air traffic controller did not properly set priorities for handling multiple aircraft. The families of the two helicopter pilots sued the contractor that ran the airport's tower. A Frederick County jury awarded them $17 million.

== In popular culture ==
The Frederick Municipal Airport, called Frederick Field in the movie, is featured in the 1996 action film Executive Decision starring Kurt Russell, though the airport filmed is not Frederick Municipal Airport but rather Van Nuys Airport.

== See also ==
- List of airports in Maryland
