= List of heliports in Washington, D.C. =

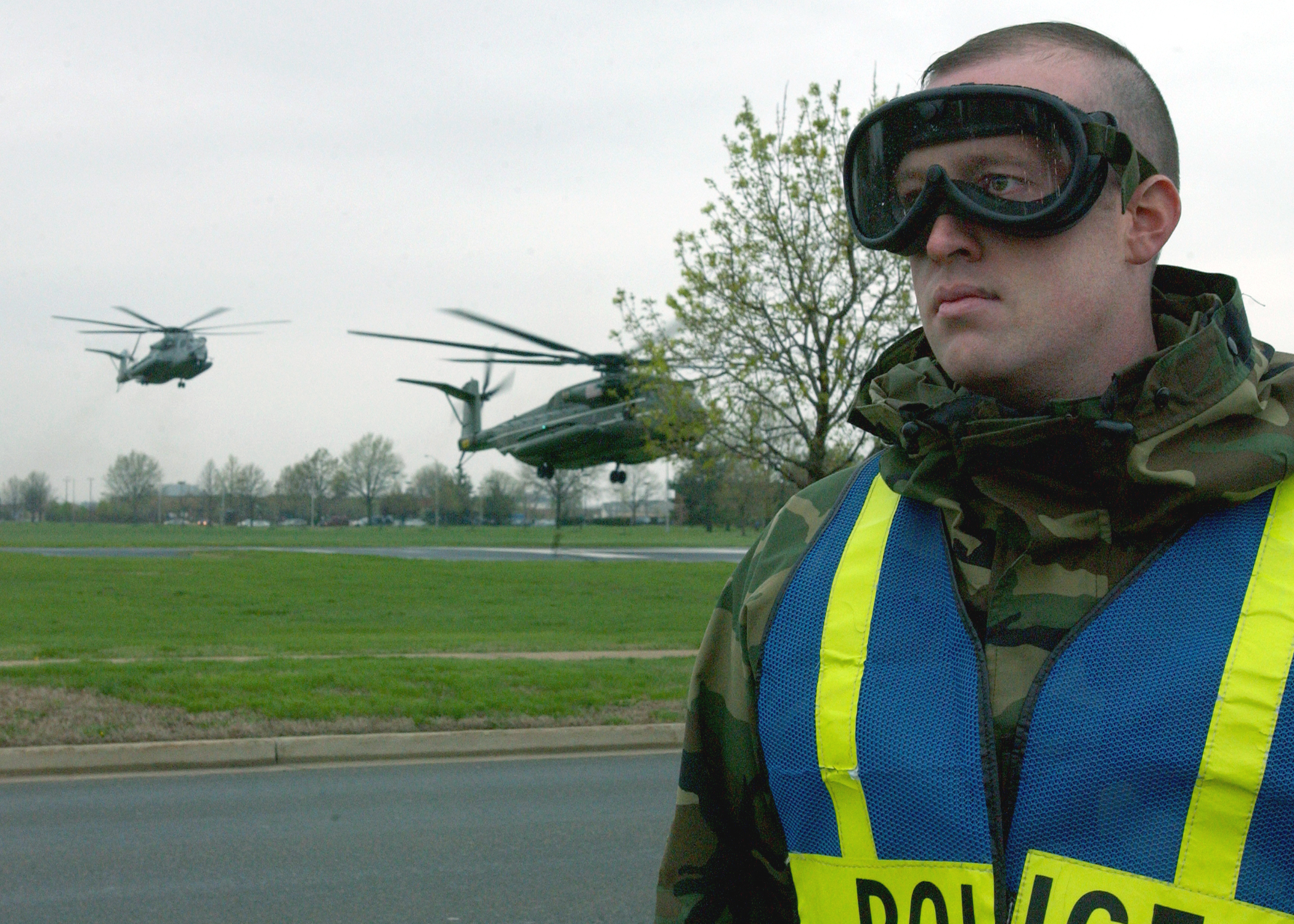
Helicopters at Bolling Air Force Base

There are 13 heliports within Washington, D.C., the federal capital district of the United States, as of 2021. As of 2002, there are also 32 others in the Washington metropolitan area. Of this total, 22 belong to hospitals, 12 to other corporations or private owners, 10 government, three military, and one public.

No active facilities for fixed-wing aircraft exist within the geographically small and densely populated city. The district has not had any such facilities since 1962, when NAS Anacostia and Bolling AFB demolished their runways and abolished their seaplane base on the Potomac River. Airports associated with DC (such as Dulles, Reagan, or Baltimore/Washington) are instead located nearby in Virginia or Maryland.

The White House does not have its own heliport, but uses a helipad on the South Lawn, with portable communications equipment brought out for Marine One arrivals and departures.

== Heliports in D.C. ==
FAA	IATA	ICAO	Name	Owner / Operator	Coordinates
Public Use
09W			South Capitol Street Heliport	South Capitol Street Heliport, LLC	38.868723°N 77.007476°W
Military
JPN	JPN	KJPN	Pentagon Army Heliport (Note: Not included in above count)	United States Army	38.8740556°N 77.0575000°W
BOF	BOF	KBOF	Joint Base Anacostia-Bolling	United States Navy & United States Air Force	38.842891°N 77.016087°W
Private
DC17			Children's National Medical Center	Children's National Medical Center	38.927635°N 77.014389°W
DC09			Georgetown University Hospital	Georgetown University	38.910495°N 77.077644°W
24DC			George Washington University Hospital	Universal Health Services	38.900938°N 77.051125°W
DC06			MPD 2nd District	Metropolitan Police Department	38.934824°N 77.074835°W
DC16			MPD 3rd District	Metropolitan Police Department	38.917896°N 77.038108°W
DC07			MPD 5th District	Metropolitan Police Department	38.915111°N 76.973308°W
DC52			Sibley Memorial Hospital	Sibley Memorial Hospital	38.936928°N 77.110557°W
DC04			Spirit of Washington Heliport	Spirit of Washington	38.874279°N 77.021366°W
DC03			US Park Police Eagle's Nest	National Park Service	38.866501°N 76.992753°W
DC08			MedStar Washington Hospital Center	MedStar Health	38.928861°N 77.016639°W

== South Capitol Street Heliport ==
Until 1996, the Metropolitan Police Department (MPDC) operated eight helicopters, including three MD-500s and five Bell OH-58s. The MPDC had heliports in the 2nd, 3rd, and 5th police districts. The helicopters were sold after budget cuts; the MPDC used National Park Service helicopters as needed. In 2001, the MPDC obtained a new Eurocopter AS350, and flies it from the South Capitol Street Heliport at Buzzard Point.

From 1998 until the September 11 attacks, Air Pegasus operated helicopter sightseeing and other transportation services out of the South Capitol Street Heliport, but the federal government has not allowed it to resume operations due to security concerns. WTTG Fox-5 also used the heliport from 1999 to 2001, then moved its operations elsewhere. On November 10, 2010, District of Columbia Congressional delegate Eleanor Holmes Norton asked the TSA to allow the South Capitol Street Heliport to reopen for non-governmental use.

== See also ==
- List of airports serving Washington, D.C.
- List of airports in Virginia
- List of airports in Maryland
