= Massey Aerodrome =

- IATA: none; ICAO: none; FAA LID: MD1

Summary
- Operator: Massey Aero LLC
- Serves: Massey, Maryland
- Location: 33541 Maryland Line Rd., Massey, MD 21650
- Built: 2001
- Elevation AMSL: 73 ft / 22 m
- Coordinates: 39°17′57″N 075°47′58″W
- Website: http://masseyaero.org

Map
- Location of airport in Maryland

Runways
Direction	Length		Surface
Direction	ft	m	Surface
2-20	3,000	914	Turf

Statistics (2019)
- 23 flying airplanes, 11 gliders on field

Massey Aerodrome (ICAO: KMD1, FAA LID: MD1) is an airport located 2 miles (3 km) east of Massey, Maryland, United States.

== History ==
Massey Aerodrome is a public use airport with a 3,000 ft × 100 ft (914 m × 30 m) grass runway (ID: MD1) dedicated to the preservation of grassroots aviation.

It was created from farmland in 2001 by four pilots. In 2015, five new partners joined the one remaining original partner to ensure the continuing success of Massey.

Massey Aerodrome features the Massey Air Museum, a static DC-3 that visitors can enter, 24 flying airplanes, 13 gliders, a rotating beacon tower, and a 100-year-old working windmill with a cypress wood tank inside the tower.

Static displays include:

- N18111 1937 Douglas DC-3A (s/n #1983) United Airlines. It was painted "Air Transport Command" for a restaurant in the early 1980s (marking it as a C-47), but it had never been used in military service. This airplane was used in the 1938 movie Test Pilot.
- Antonov An-2 "world's largest single-engine biplane" Soviet Union, 1000 hp engine
- Life-size, fiberglass scale model Corsair on pedestal: F4U-1D Corsair, painted as F4U-5 #53 flown by Alberto H. Santa Maria

== Displays ==
- Replica 1911 Wright glider made by Jimmy Dayton for the Sport of Soaring's 100th anniversary of Orville Wright setting the world soaring record of 9 minutes, 45 seconds at Kitty Hawk, NC on October 24, 1911. This record stood for ten years until broken by the Germans in 1921. The U.S. record for soaring was not officially broken until 1929.
- N738 1946 Ercoupe 415-C, s/n 1788. Eng: 75 HP Cont. C85. Donated by John Chirtea, Milton, DE.

Engines on display include:

- 1710 hp 14 cylinder, Wright R-2600 Radial engine as used on the B-25 bomber and B-314 Boeing Clipper
- 160 hp Kinner R-5, 5 cylinder radial engine
- 37 hp Continental A-40 4 cylinder flat head engine (single spark plug and ignition), 2550 rpm, wt. 144 lb. (introduced on the 1931-1936 Taylor E-2 Cub)
- 65 hp Lycoming O-145-B2 4 cylinder horizontally opposed engine (overhead valves, dual ignition), 2300 rpm, weight 165.5 lb (1938 to late 1940s)
- Cut-away engine - Spanish Elizalde Tigre IVB (150 hp) four-cylinder inverted air-cooled engine (ca. 1940s), Used in C.A.S.A. 1.131E (license-built Bücker 131 Jungmann)

== See also ==
- List of airports in Maryland
