= Baltimore Airpark =

Coordinates: 39.404773°N 76.4260593°W

Baltimore Airpark Quinn Airport
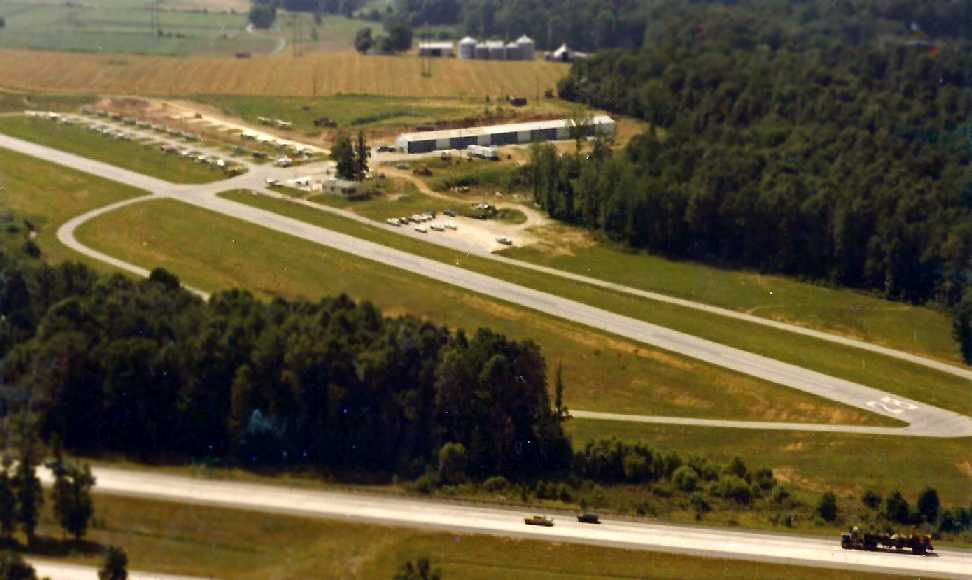
- 1975 aerial
- IATA: none; ICAO: none; FAA LID: 1W2

Summary
- Operator: Fred Quinn, Herbert Shanklin
- Serves: Perry Hall, Maryland
- Built: 1950
- Elevation AMSL: 230 ft / 70 m
- Interactive map of Baltimore Airpark

Runways
Direction	Length		Surface
Direction	ft	m	Surface
9-27	2,100	640	Paved

Baltimore Airpark, formerly Quinn Airport was an airport located in Perry Hall, Maryland, United States.

== History ==
The airport was named after Perry Hall grading contractor Frank Quinn, who excavated the 1800 ft field in the early 1950s. The first aircraft to land at the strip was a J-3 Cub, which rolled over on the dirt runway.

In 1967 Earl and Betsy Mace purchased the airfield, renaming it the Baltimore Airpark. At its peak in the 1970s, 40 aircraft were based on the field. Phoenix aviation operated a flight school onsite.

The 60 acre field was under pressure to be developed, with offers of up to a million dollars for the land. Baltimore county rezoned the land as part of the Honeygo growth zone. Attempts were made to lease the property to the Baltimore County Aviation unit, which eventually moved to Martin State Airport. It was closed and sold for a housing development in 2001.

== Terminals and destinations ==
Two hangars were constructed on the property.

== Accidents and incidents ==
An on-field fire destroyed three aircraft on 17 January 1962.
