= Friendly, Maryland =

- Census-designated place
- Location of Friendly, Maryland
- Coordinates: 38°45′0″N 76°58′27″W
- Country: United States
- State: Maryland
- County: Prince George's

Area
  - Total: 4.88 sq mi (12.64 km^{2})
  - Land: 4.88 sq mi (12.63 km^{2})
  - Water: 0.0039 sq mi (0.01 km^{2})
- Elevation: 236 ft (72 m)

Population (2020)
  - Total: 9,937
  - Density: 2,037.8/sq mi (786.81/km^{2})
- Time zone: UTC−5 (Eastern (EST))
  - Summer (DST): UTC−4 (EDT)
- FIPS code: 24-30575
- GNIS feature ID: 0597435

Friendly is an unincorporated area and census-designated place (CDP) in Prince George's County, Maryland, United States, with an African-American majority population, located a few miles south of Washington, D.C. The population was 9,937 at the 2020 census.

Friendly had its own rural post office in the early 20th century, and is now under the mailing address Fort Washington. The name "Friendly" is most associated with Friendly High School, which serves most of the greater Fort Washington area. The Friendly area was largely rural until about 1960 and has steadily grown with single-family housing developments. At least five new residential neighborhoods are currently under construction in the area. Allentown Road connects Friendly with Andrews Air Force Base.

== Geography ==
Friendly is located at 38°45′0″N 76°58′27″W (38.750064, −76.974267).

According to the United States Census Bureau, the CDP has a total area of 4.9 square miles (12.6 km^{2}), all land.

== Demographics ==
Historical population
Census	Pop.	Note	%±
2000	10,938		—
2010	9,250		−15.4%
2020	9,937		7.4%
U.S. Decennial Census; 2010 2020

=== Racial and ethnic composition ===
Friendly CDP, Maryland – Racial and ethnic composition Note: the US Census treats Hispanic/Latino as an ethnic category. This table excludes Latinos from the racial categories and assigns them to a separate category. Hispanics/Latinos may be of any race.
Race / Ethnicity (NH = Non-Hispanic)	Pop 2000	Pop 2010	Pop 2020	% 2000	% 2010	% 2020
White alone (NH)	1,425	589	538	13.03%	6.37%	5.41%
Black or African American alone (NH)	8,421	7,296	6,697	76.99%	78.88%	67.39%
Native American or Alaska Native alone (NH)	34	24	11	0.31%	0.26%	0.11%
Asian alone (NH)	614	426	512	5.61%	4.61%	5.15%
Native Hawaiian or Pacific Islander alone (NH)	8	4	5	0.07%	0.04%	0.05%
Other race alone (NH)	15	22	99	0.14%	0.24%	1.00%
Mixed race or Multiracial (NH)	182	186	313	1.66%	2.01%	3.15%
Hispanic or Latino (any race)	239	703	1,762	2.19%	7.60%	17.73%
Total	10,938	9,250	9,937	100.00%	100.00%	100.00%

=== 2020 census ===
As of the 2020 census, Friendly had a population of 9,937. The median age was 43.8 years. 18.8% of residents were under the age of 18 and 19.8% of residents were 65 years of age or older. For every 100 females there were 93.9 males, and for every 100 females age 18 and over there were 90.9 males age 18 and over.

100.0% of residents lived in urban areas, while 0.0% lived in rural areas.

There were 3,326 households in Friendly, of which 28.1% had children under the age of 18 living in them. Of all households, 49.6% were married-couple households, 15.8% were households with a male householder and no spouse or partner present, and 29.7% were households with a female householder and no spouse or partner present. About 20.5% of all households were made up of individuals and 9.5% had someone living alone who was 65 years of age or older.

There were 3,410 housing units, of which 2.5% were vacant. The homeowner vacancy rate was 0.8% and the rental vacancy rate was 3.7%.

=== 2000 census ===
As of the 2000 census, there were 10,938 people, 3,506 households, and 2,962 families residing in the CDP. The population density was 1,610.3 inhabitants per square mile (621.7/km^{2}). There were 3,636 housing units at an average density of 535.3 per square mile (206.7/km^{2}). The racial makeup of the CDP was 77.67% African American, 13.39% White, 0.36% Native American, 5.66% Asian, 0.07% Pacific Islander, 0.98% from other races, and 1.87% from two or more races. Hispanic or Latino of any race were 2.19% of the population.

There were 3,506 households, out of which 38.4% had children under the age of 18 living with them, 65.6% were married couples living together, 13.9% had a female householder with no husband present, and 15.5% were non-families. 12.2% of all households were made up of individuals, and 2.5% had someone living alone who was 65 years of age or older. The average household size was 3.12 and the average family size was 3.36.

In the CDP, the population was spread out, with 27.4% under the age of 18, 7.5% from 18 to 24, 27.8% from 25 to 44, 30.3% from 45 to 64, and 7.0% who were 65 years of age or older. The median age was 38 years. For every 100 females, there were 93.0 males. For every 100 females age 18 and over, there were 90.5 males.

The median income for a household in the CDP was $80,214, and the median income for a family was $82,827. Males had a median income of $43,281 versus $42,086 for females. The per capita income for the CDP was $28,545. About 0.2% of families and 0.4% of the population were below the poverty line, including 0.2% of those under age 18 and 0.5% of those age 65 or over. By the end of 2020, the CDP ranks # 8 among top 10 richest black communities in US, with an average family income of $82,827.

== Transportation ==
Potomac Airfield is in Friendly CDP, with a Fort Washington address.

== Education ==
Friendly is served by the Prince George's County School District.

Zoned elementary schools serving the CDP are Rose Valley Elementary School and Tayac Elementary School. Isaac J. Gourdine Middle School and Friendly High School serve all of the current CDP.

Fort Washington Elementary School and Accokeek Middle School serve areas that were in the Friendly CDP (now in Fort Washington CDP) until 2010.
