= Rex Smith Aeroplane Company =

American aircraft manufacturer

- Industry: Aircraft production
- Founded: 1910
- Defunct: 1916
- Headquarters: College Park, Maryland, US
- Key people: Rex Smith (1862–1923)
- Products: Rex Smith Biplane

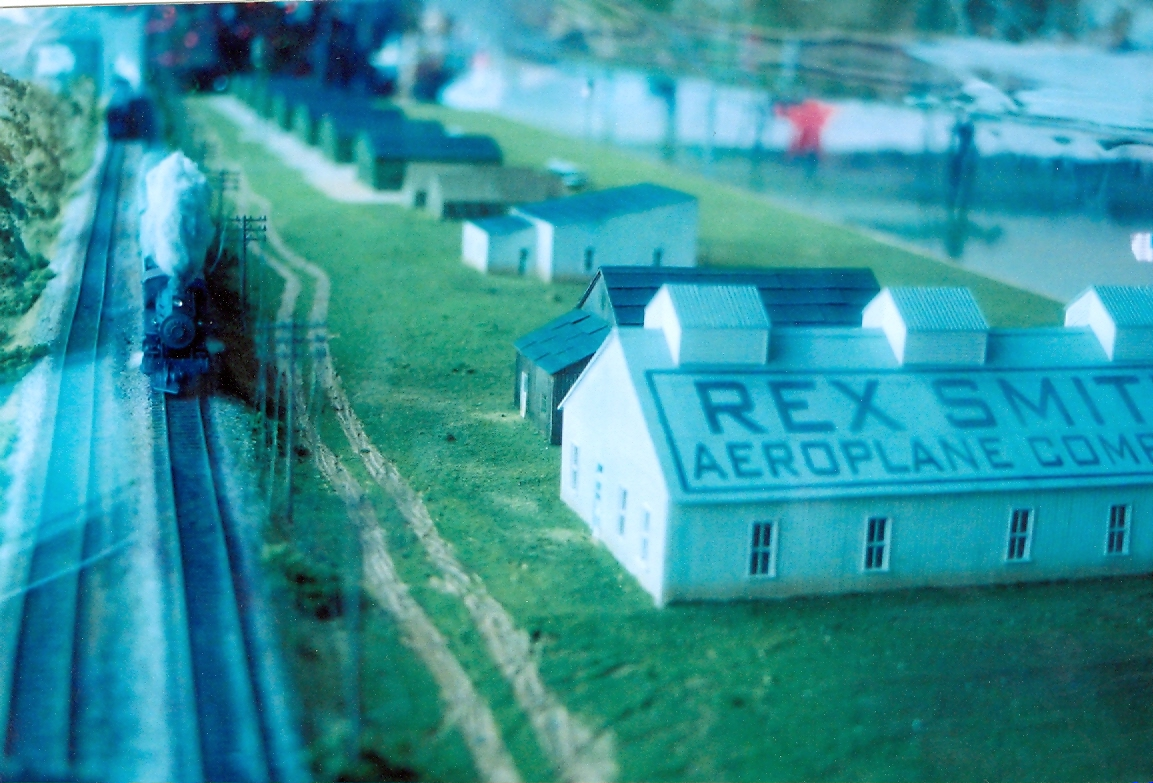
A Model of the Rex Smith Aeroplane Company in 1920

Rex Smith Aeroplane Company was an American aircraft manufacturer in College Park, Maryland.

The company was founded in 1910, by Rex Smith, who was an inventor and patent attorney. He placed his offices in Washington D.C., and operations at College Park Airport. The company was capitalized with $500,000 in 1910 with Victor J Evans as president and Rex Smith as Vice president.

In 1911, Rex Smith moved his hangar to line up with the Army Aviation School, and hired Frank Kastory from Anzani, and Abraham Whalomie Raygorodsky from Russia. He test flew Smith aircraft alongside Fox engine powered Curtiss aircraft. Rex also hired Tony Jannus, and Paul Peck as test pilots. In a stroke of coincidence, flying at the same airport at the same time was another military aviator, Paul W. Beck.

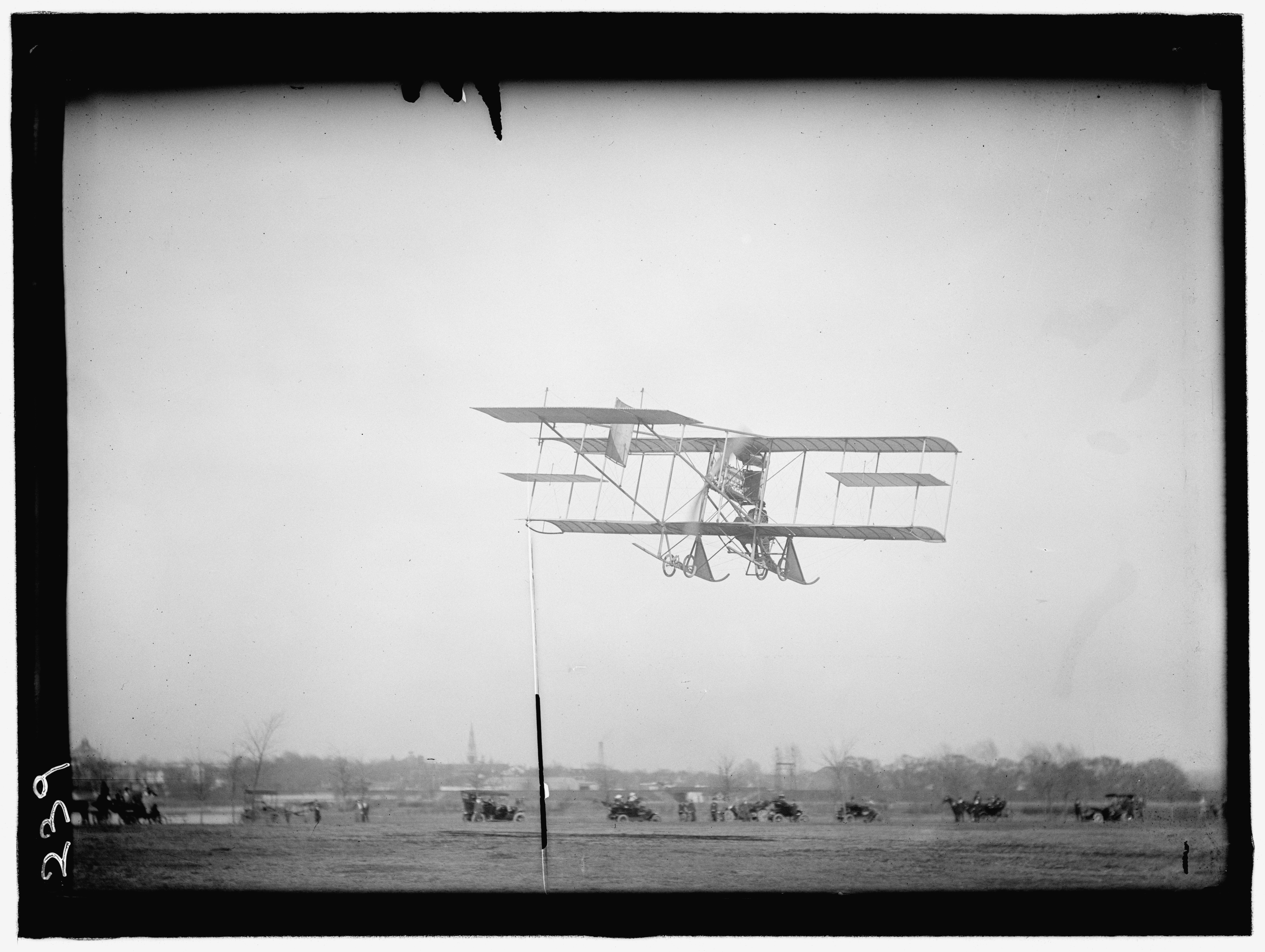
Rex Smith plane in flight

The Rex Smith Biplane was used in the successful April 3, 1911 U.S. Army Signal Corps experiments in wireless communications. Potomac river pontoon experiments on April 5, were not as successful, with the aircraft plowing into the water headfirst nearly drowning the test pilot Jannus. Just two days later the machine was ready again. Janus took up actor Nat M. Wills, and later two female passengers at the same time. Marking the first time an aircraft flew with more than one passenger in the United States.

The Signal Corps did not buy any Smith Biplanes, they did however use them from time to time to train pilots to fly the Curtiss aircraft at the same field.

== Aircraft ==
Summary of aircraft built by
Model name	First flight	Number built	Type
Rex Smith Biplane	1910	2	Pusher Biplane
