= Washington Executive Airport =

Airport in Maryland, US, 1934 to 2022

Washington Executive Airport Hyde Field
- IATA: none; ICAO: none; FAA LID: W32

Summary
- Airport type: Public
- Operator: Zachair, Ltd.
- Location: Clinton, Maryland
- Elevation AMSL: 249 ft / 75.9 m
- Coordinates: 38°44′54″N 76°55′58″W

Map
- Location of airport in Maryland W32 (the United States)

Runways
Direction	Length		Surface
Direction	ft	m	Surface
5/23	3,000	914	Asphalt

Washington Executive Airport (FAA LID: W32), also known as Washington Executive Airpark or Hyde Field, was a public use general aviation airport located 2 miles (3.2 km) southwest of the central business district (CBD) of Clinton, in Prince George's County, Maryland, United States. The airport ceased operations on November 30, 2022, following a bankruptcy sale of the property.

Hyde Field was one of the "Maryland 3" or "DC-3" airports (along with Potomac Airfield and College Park Airport) located within the Washington, D.C. Flight Restricted Zone (FRZ), so it was subject to the Special Flight Rules Area (SFRA) restrictions that were established after the September 11 attacks.

It was located just 1.10 nautical miles (1.27 mi) east of a slightly smaller Potomac Airfield.

== History ==
Hyde opened in 1934 as a training field for United States Army aviators.

Due to the onerous SFRA restrictions leading to declining revenues at the airport, in 2008 there were plans to shut it down and redevelop the land. However, the airport remained open and operational until 2022.

== Closure ==
On October 31, 2022, airport tenants were notified that the field was closing and were given until November 30, 2022, to remove their aircraft and any belongings after which the new owners will repurpose the property for housing development.

== Facilities ==
Washington Executive Airport/Hyde Field covered 140 acres (57 ha) and had one runway:

- Runway 5/23: 3,000 feet (910 m) x 60 feet (18 m), surface: asphalt
