= Paul Peck =

American aviator (1889–1912)

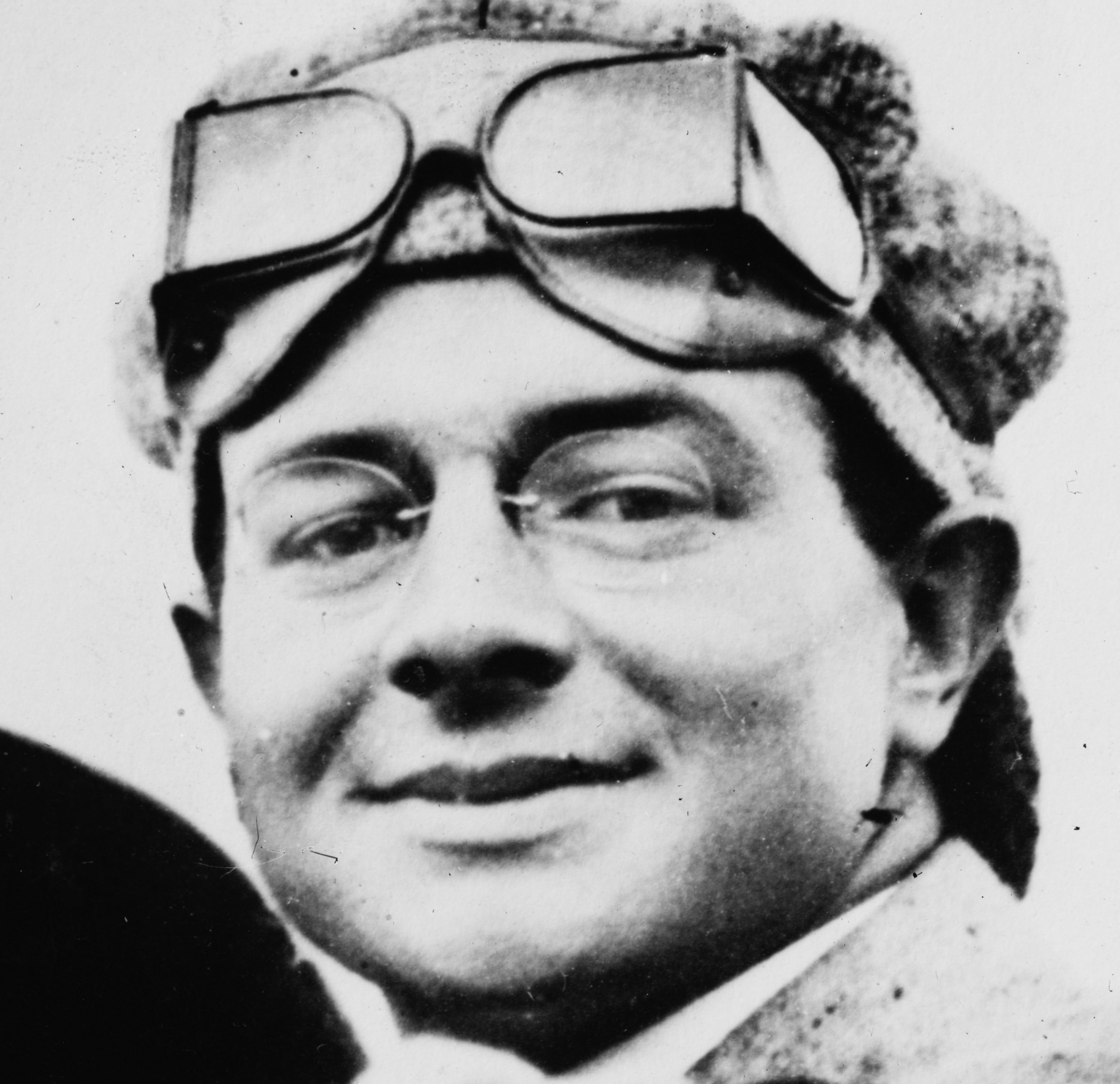
- Born: August 10, 1889; Ansted, West Virginia, US
- Died: September 11 or 12, 1912 (age 23); Chicago, Illinois, US
- Resting place: Rockville Cemetery, Rockville, Maryland
- Occupation: aviator
- Years active: 1911–1912
- Spouse: Ruth Owens Peck (1893–1912)
- Children: Paul Peck, Jr. (1912–1919)

Paul Peck (August 10, 1889 – September 11 or 12, 1912) was an early U.S. aviator. The first aviator from the U.S. state of West Virginia, he set a number of aviation firsts and records before dying in a plane crash.

== Early life ==
Peck was born in Ansted, West Virginia, on August 10, 1889, the son of Leonidas McFarland "Lon" Peck (1857–1934) and Alice Peck née Masters (1869–1956), of Lewisburg, West Virginia. His father was a railroad agent. Peck spent most of his childhood in Hinton, West Virginia. As a child, he became interested in machinery and automobiles, and enjoyed tinkering with automotive engines.

In addition to Hinton, Peck lived in Philadelphia, Pennsylvania, and Charleston, West Virginia. As a young man, he worked in Washington, D.C. as a chauffeur for Isaac T. Mann, a millionaire from West Virginia, and drove in automobile races.

== Aviation career ==
Peck's interest in aviation arose from his interest in automobiles, as well as his association with his fiancee's cousin Rex Smith, an aviation pioneer and owner of the Rex Smith Aeroplane Company. He began flying lessons in 1911 and learned to fly in seven days. Sources provide differing accounts of the beginning of his flying career: According to one, he did not begin flying lessons until August 12, 1911. but another states that he qualified for his pilot's license on July 29–30, 1911, becoming the first aircraft pilot from West Virginia. It was the 57th pilot's license issued by, according to different sources, either the Fédération Aéronautique Internationale or the Aero Club of America, He apparently landed a plane in Raleigh County, West Virginia, in 1911, probably becoming the first person to fly an airplane over West Virginia.

The United States Army selected Peck as one of only three officers to learn to fly under aviation pioneer Glenn H. Curtiss. In 1911, Peck became one of the first flight instructors at the United States Army Signal Corps flight school at College Park Airport in College Park, Maryland, which went on to become the oldest continuously operating airport in the world. The governor of West Virginia, William E. Glasscock, bestowed the honorific title of "colonel" on Peck, but this did not reflect an actual military rank. The United States Army gave him the rank of first lieutenant as an instructor in its aviation training program.

Peck set altitude records and flew planes designed by Rex Smith Aeroplane Company, serving as a test pilot for the company. He also designed and built his own airplane, the Peck Columbian, a pusher biplane with a Gyro Motor Company 50-horsepower (37 kW) engine driving a single propeller at 1,200 to 1,500 revolutions per minute. Controlled by a steering wheel, the Columbian — which he named Miss Columbia — was "headless," i.e., it did not have its elevators mounted in front of the cockpit. The Columbian could achieve a speed of 70 miles per hour (113 km/h).

In August 1911, Peck became the first person to fly an airplane over the United States Capitol in Washington, D.C. He then flew down Pennsylvania Avenue and circled the Washington Monument, setting an aviation speed record in the process by covering 24 miles (39 km) in 25 minutes. One source specifies that this flight took place on 5 August 1911, while others imply a different date, claiming he made the flight "two weeks" after he earned his pilot's license.

In September 1911, Peck became the first pilot to carry air mail in official United States Post Office flights. His second fight, at Garden City, New York, was the first for which a U.S. Post Office was established specifically to handle air mail.

Peck's best-known achievement during his lifetime was the flight endurance record he set on May 24, 1912, when he remained aloft for four hours 33 minutes 15 seconds despite heavy winds, blinding rain, and hail. Sources disagree over whether the flight took place over Long Island, New York, or Boston, Massachusetts. One source claims that he also set a record for "landing accuracy," without describing it.

While participating in a three-day aviation meet at South Charleston, West Virginia, on June 26, 1912, Peck impressed a crowd of 5,000 onlookers when he took off in the Peck Columbian from a ball field despite an approaching thunderstorm for a 6-mile (9.7 km) round-trip flight, determined to circle the West Virginia State Capitol in Charleston. Fighting heavy winds, he reached an altitude of 2,000 feet (610 m), executed a perfect circle around the dome of the capitol, then covered the 3 miles (4.8 km) back to the ball field in 90 seconds at a speed of 75 miles per hour (121 km/h). His flight took 11 minutes 30 seconds. At other times during the meet, he demonstrated his "ocean roll," a spectacular maneuver for its time that required a series of short dives and climbs and required him to shut off the engine before each dive and restart it for each climb.

== Death ==
In September 1912, Peck travelled to Chicago, Illinois, to participate in the Second Chicago International Air Meet and represent the United States in the 1912 Gordon Bennett Trophy race, scheduled to take place as part of the air meet. On September 11, the day before the race, he took off from Cicero Field in Miss Columbia to prepare for the race, despite warnings of dangerous flying conditions due to high winds and stormy conditions; he believed his biplane′s speed would allow him to overcome the weather conditions. At an altitude of between 800 and 1,000 feet (244 and 305 m), according to different sources, he put the airplane into a steep and rapid spiraling dive. As he reached an altitude of 200 feet (61 m), observers on the ground could see that he had lost control of the plane, its engine apparently having come loose in flight, probably during his ascent. The plane began to disintegrate in the air and crashed at a speed of 100 miles per hour (161 km/h), the engine and its whirling propeller, gasoline tank, and iron fittings passing through the cockpit on impact, breaking his neck and injuring his legs. He died in St. Anthony de Padua Hospital, sources disagreeing on whether he died on September 11, an hour after the crash, or several hours later, on September 12.

Peck's funeral in Washington, D.C., included a motor hearse, a motor wagon loaded with floral pieces, and about 30 other automobiles. It made history as the city's first funeral procession consisting entirely of motor vehicles, with no horse-drawn vehicles participating.

== Personal life ==
In 1911, Peck married Ruth Owens, a young woman from Washington, D.C., where the couple made their home. Ruth gave birth to a son and their only child, Paul Peck, Jr., on April 4, 1912, and died at the age of 19 during the night of April 5–6, 1912, due to complications from childbirth, a blood transfusion from her husband failing to save her life. When Peck was killed just over five months later, the orphaned Paul Jr. was left in the care of grandparents. Paul Jr. died of complications of influenza at the age of six on March 27, 1919, during the Spanish influenza pandemic.

Paul Peck, Ruth Peck, and Paul Peck, Jr., all are buried at Rockville Cemetery in Rockville, Maryland.

== Commemoration ==
In 1979, Paul Peck's last living descendants presented a commemorative plaque in his memory to Greenbrier Valley Airport outside Lewisburg, West Virginia. As of 2003, it was on display in the airport's terminal.
