= Bennett Airport =

- IATA: none; ICAO: none; FAA LID: 1N5

Summary
- Airport type: Public use
- Owner: Howard W. Bennett Jr.
- Location: Salisbury, Maryland
- Elevation AMSL: 42 ft / 12 m
- Coordinates: 38°24′45″N 075°37′00″W

Map
- Location of airport in Maryland 1N5 (the United States)

Runways
Direction	Length		Surface
Direction	ft	m	Surface
17/35	3,150	960	Turf
08/26	2,300	701	Turf

Statistics (2014)
- Aircraft operations: 41
- Based aircraft: 9

Bennett Airport (FAA LID: 1N5) is a privately owned public-use airport located in Salisbury, Maryland, USA.

== Location and Access ==
Bennett Airport is accessible via Naylor Mill Road and is situated near major highways US 50 and US 13, providing convenient access to the Delmarva Peninsula region. The airport serves the general aviation community, offering facilities for flight training and aircraft maintenance.

== Facilities and aircraft ==
There are nine aircraft based at this airport, eight single-engine and one ultralight.

In 2014, the airport had 46,000 aircraft operations for an average of 41 per week.
