= Carroll County Regional Airport =

Carroll County Regional Airport Jack B. Poage Field
- IATA: none; ICAO: KDMW; FAA LID: DMW

Summary
- Airport type: Public
- Owner: Carroll County
- Location: Westminster, Maryland
- Elevation AMSL: 789 ft (240 m)
- Coordinates: 39°36′30″N 077°00′28″W
- Website: https://carrollcountyregionalairport.com/

Map
- Location of airport in Maryland / United States DMW (the United States)

Runways
Direction	Length		Surface
Direction	ft	m	Surface
16/34	5,100	1,554	Asphalt

Statistics (2023)
- Aircraft operations (year ending 5/4/2023): 56,224
- Based aircraft: 112
- Source: Federal Aviation Administration

Carroll County Regional Airport (ICAO: KDMW, FAA LID: DMW), also known as Jack B. Poage Field, is a public airport located three miles (5 km) north of the central business district of Westminster, in Carroll County, Maryland, United States. The airport is owned by Carroll County Board of Commissioners. It is designated as a reliever airport for the Baltimore-Washington International Thurgood Marshall Airport (BWI).

Although most U.S. airports use the same three-letter location identifier for the FAA and IATA, Carroll County Regional Airport is assigned DMW by the FAA but has no designation from the IATA due to the small size of the airport and its main use being general aviation.

== Facilities and aircraft ==
Carroll County Regional Airport covers an area of 475 acres (192 ha) which contains one asphalt paved runway (16/34) measuring 5,100 x 100 ft (1,554 x 30 m). The airport also has a flight school called Dream Flight School.

For the 12-month period ending May 4, 2023, the airport had 56,224 aircraft operations, an average of 154 per day: 99% general aviation, <1% air taxi and <1% military. There was at that time 112 aircraft based at this airport: 90 single engine, 13 multi-engine, 3 jet aircraft and 6 helicopters.

There are currently no plans to bring commercial service to the airport. The nearest airport with commercial service is Baltimore BWI airport, serving flights to many US cities and with a few flights to/from Europe.

The airport does not have air traffic control.

== Amenities ==
The airport is near MD-97. It is also located in the vicinity of Carroll County Pond. It is near a populated area of Carroll County.

== See also ==
- List of airports in Maryland
