= Clearview, Virginia =

Unincorporated community in Virginia, US

Coordinates: 37°32′54″N 75°54′16″W

Clearview is an unincorporated community in Northampton County, Virginia, United States.
