= Cambridge–Dorchester Airport =

Cambridge–Dorchester Regional Airport
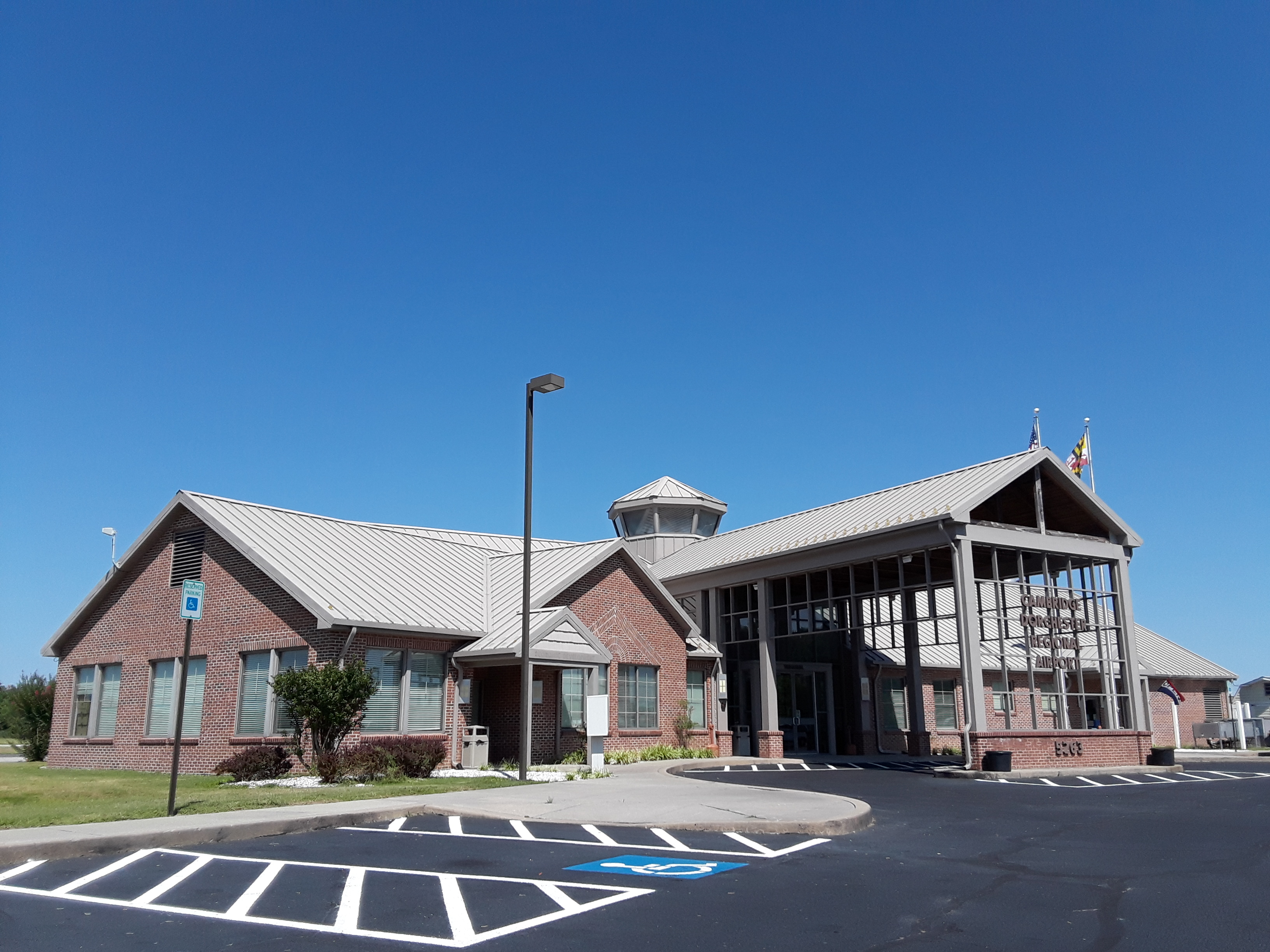
- IATA: CGE; ICAO: KCGE; FAA LID: CGE

Summary
- Airport type: Public
- Owner: Dorchester County Commissioners
- Serves: Cambridge, Maryland
- Elevation AMSL: 20 ft (6.1 m)
- Coordinates: 38°32′22″N 076°01′49″W

Map
- Location of airport in Maryland CGE (the United States)

Runways
Direction	Length		Surface
Direction	ft	m	Surface
16/34	4,477	1,365	Asphalt

Statistics (2023)
- Aircraft operations (year ending 5/18/2023): 24,594
- Based aircraft: 40
- Source: Federal Aviation Administration

Cambridge–Dorchester Regional Airport (IATA: CGE, ICAO: KCGE, FAA LID: CGE) is a county-owned, public-use airport located three nautical miles (6 km) southeast of the central business district of Cambridge, in Dorchester County, Maryland, United States. Steve Nuwer is currently the Airport Manager.

== Facilities and aircraft ==
Cambridge–Dorchester Regional Airport covers an area of 354 acres (143 ha) at an elevation of 20 feet (6 m) above mean sea level. It has one runway designated 16/34 with a 4,477 x 75 ft (1,365 x 23 m) asphalt surface.

For the 12-month period ending May 18, 2023, the airport had 24,594 aircraft operations, an average of 67 per day: 95% general aviation and 5% military. At that time there were 40 aircraft based at this airport: 39 single-engine, and 1 multi-engine.

== See also ==
- List of airports in Maryland
