= Pier 7 Heliport =

- IATA: none; ICAO: none; FAA LID: 4MD

Summary
- Operator: 1800 SOUTH CLINTON STREET, LLC
- Serves: Canton, Maryland
- Built: 2006
- Elevation AMSL: 16 ft / 5 m
- Coordinates: 39°16′17″N 76°34′21″W

Map
- Location of airport in Maryland

Runways
Direction	Length		Surface
Direction	ft	m	Surface
H1	45	14	Concrete

Statistics (2014)
- 71 operations per week

Pier 7 Heliport (FAA LID: 4MD) is a heliport located two miles east of Baltimore, Maryland, United States, on the Chesapeake Bay.

== History ==
Baltimore Helicopter Services was granted access to Washington National Airport without having to land at a gateway airport in 2013.
