= Clearview Airpark =

- IATA: none; ICAO: K2W2; FAA LID: 2W2

Summary
- Owner/Operator: Clearview Airport Inc.
- Location: Westminster, Maryland
- Built: 1966
- Occupants: 30
- Elevation AMSL: 799 ft / 244 m
- Coordinates: 39°28′N 77°01′W

Map
- Location of airport in Maryland

Runways
Direction	Length		Surface
Direction	ft	m	Surface
14/32	1,840	561	Asphalt

Clearview Airpark (ICAO: K2W2, FAA LID: 2W2) is an airport located in Westminster, Maryland, United States.

Clearview Airpark houses 30 general aviation aircraft with 15,300 operations annually (2011). The airport has been in operation since 1966.
