= Potomac Airfield =

Airport in Prince George's County, Maryland, United States

- IATA: none; ICAO: KVKX; FAA LID: VKX

Summary
- Airport type: Public
- Owner: Copley Investments
- Serves: Washington DC metro area
- Location: Friendly CDP, Maryland
- Elevation AMSL: 118 ft / 36 m
- Coordinates: 38°44′55″N 076°57′21″W
- Website: Potomac-Airfield.com

Map
- Location of airport in Maryland VKX (the United States)

Runways
Direction	Length		Surface
Direction	ft	m	Surface
6/24	2,665	812	Asphalt

Statistics
- Based aircraft: 91
- Source: FAA and airport website

Potomac Airfield (ICAO: KVKX, FAA LID: VKX), also known as Potomac Airport (/pəˈtoʊmək/), a privately owned, public-use airport located in the Friendly census-designated place in unincorporated Prince George's County, Maryland, United States (just outside Washington, D.C.); it has a Fort Washington postal address. It is a general aviation airport, and there is no scheduled airline service available.

Potomac Airfield is located within the Washington, D.C. Flight Restricted Zone (FRZ). In order to take off or land at the airport, pilots must apply for a regional security clearance through the airport's website, or the FAA.

== Facilities and aircraft ==
Potomac Airfield covers an area of 50 acres (20 ha), and features one paved asphalt runway (6/24) measuring 2,665 x 40 ft (812 x 12 m). In the year ending September 14, 2023, there were 12,054 operations, average 33 per day. There were at that time 94 aircraft based at this airport: 91 single engine and 3 multi-engine.

== In popular culture ==
The airfield appears in a season 3 episode of Fetch! With Ruff Ruffman entitled "Mission Improbable".

== See also ==
- List of airports in Maryland
