= College Park Airport =

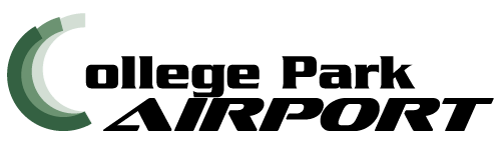

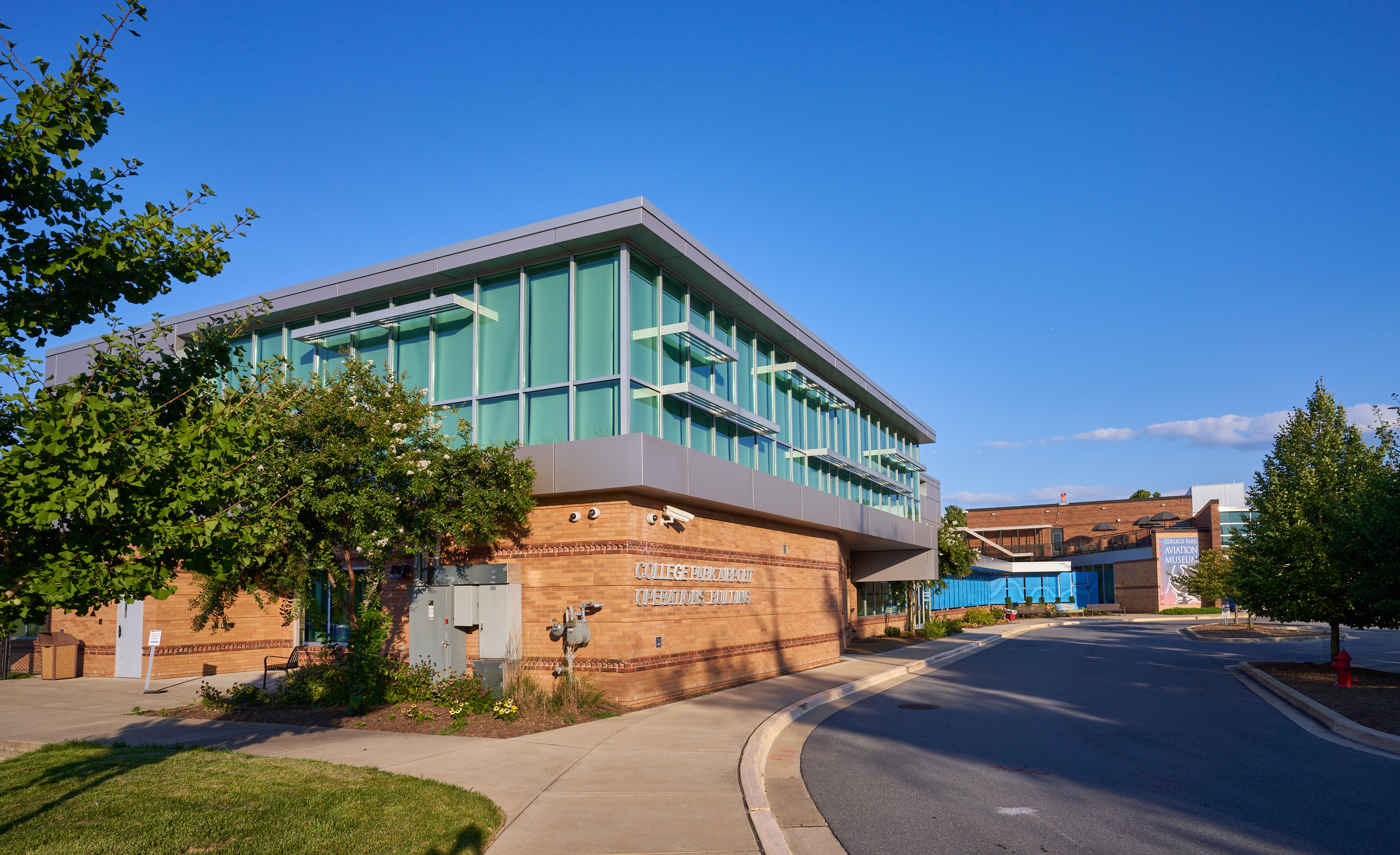
- College Park airport operations building with the Aviation museum on the right.
- IATA: CGS; ICAO: KCGS; FAA LID: CGS

Summary
- Airport type: Public
- Operator: Maryland-National Capital Park & Planning Commission
- Location: College Park, Maryland
- Opened: 1909; 117 years ago
- Elevation AMSL: 48 ft (15 m)
- Coordinates: 38°58′50.1″N 76°55′20.3″W
- Website: collegeparkairport.aero

Map
- Location of airport in Maryland CGS (the United States)

Runways
Direction	Length		Surface
Direction	ft	m	Surface
15/33	2,980	908.3	Asphalt
- College Park Airport
- U.S. National Register of Historic Places
- Nearest city: College Park, Maryland
- Built: 1908
- NRHP reference No.: 77001522
- Added to NRHP: September 23, 1977

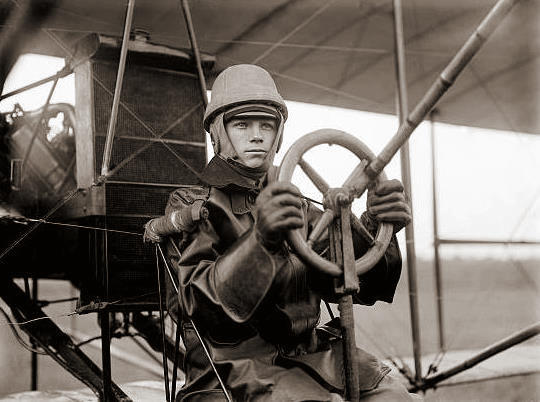
A pilot flying a Curtiss aircraft at College Park in 1912

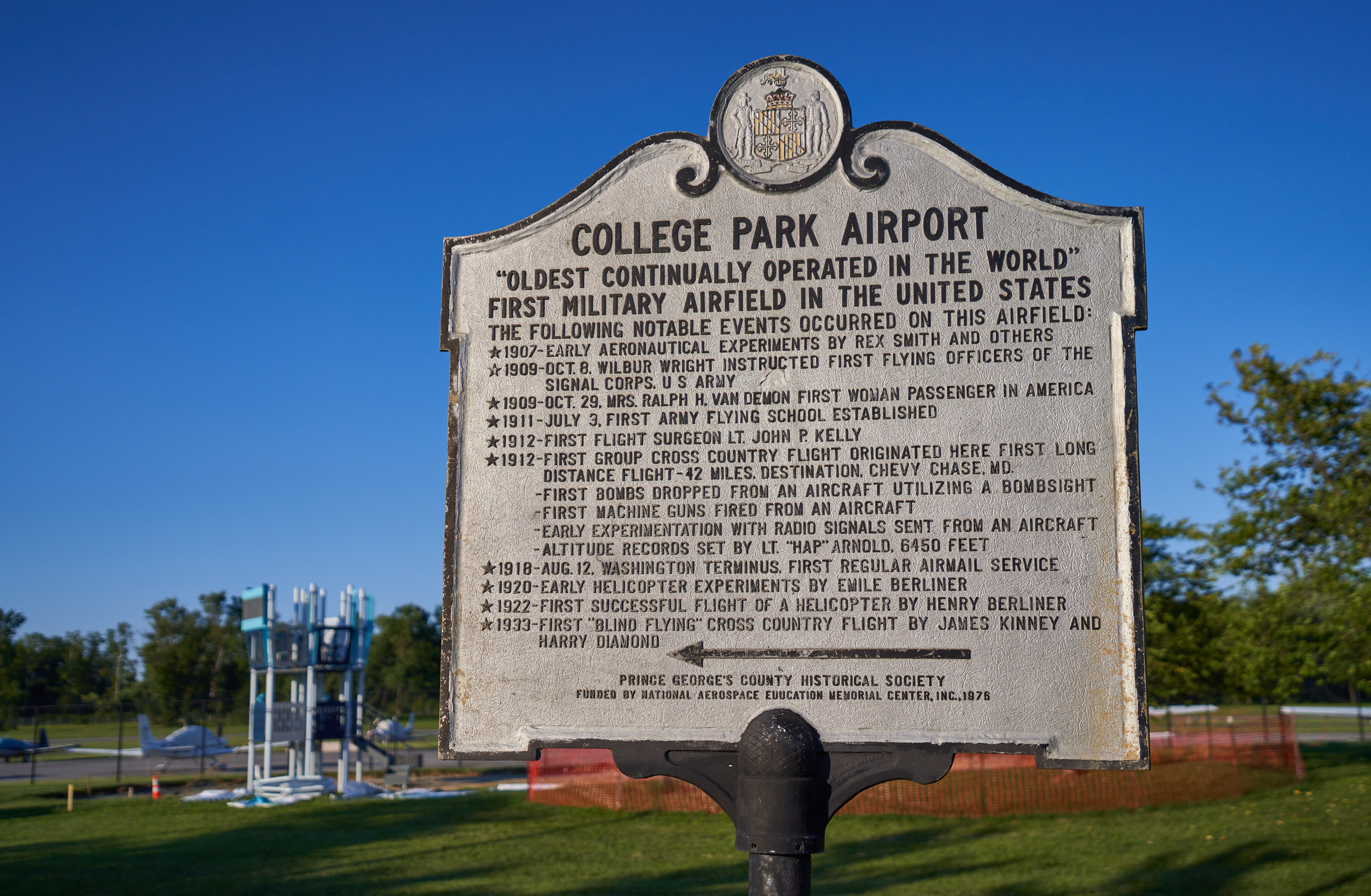
Sign showing the historical timeline of the College Park airport

College Park Airport (IATA: CGS, ICAO: KCGS, FAA LID: CGS) is a public airport located in the City of College Park, in Prince George's County, Maryland, United States. It is the world's oldest continuously operated airport. The airport is located south of Paint Branch and Lake Artemesia, east of U.S. Route 1 and the College Park Metro/MARC station and west of Kenilworth Avenue.

== History ==
College Park Airport was established in August 1909 by the United States Army Signal Corps to serve as a training location for Wilbur Wright to instruct two military officers to fly in the government's first airplane. Leased on August 25, the first airplane, a Wright Type A biplane, was uncrated and assembled on October 7. Civilian aircraft began flying from College Park Airport as early as December 1911, making it the world's oldest continuously operated airport. In 1977, the airport was added to the National Register of Historic Places.

College Park Airport is home to many "firsts" in aviation, and is particularly significant for the well-known aviators and aviation inventors who played a part in this field's long history. In 1909, Wilbur Wright taught Lieutenants Frederic Humphreys and Frank Lahm. Humphreys became the first military pilot to solo in a government airplane. The same year on October 27, Mrs. Ralph Henry Van Deman was flown by Wilbur Wright to become the first woman to fly in a powered aircraft in the United States.

Civilian aviation began at College Park with Rex Smith, an inventor and patent attorney, who operated the Rex Smith Aeroplane Company. Paul Peck and Tony Jannus were associates of his.

In April 1910, the Aero Club of America chapters from Washington and Baltimore chose the College Park Airport for the next James Gordon Bennett Race. $11,000 was raised locally of the $100,000 prize. Belmont Park in New York was chosen instead for the October meet.

The Christmas Aeroplane Company of Washington, D.C., built its first aircraft, the "Red Bird II" at College Park Airport with a claimed flight on 15 October 1911. The "Red Bird III" was built in the spring of 1912, with a contract from the U.S. Postal service to deliver Air Mail.

In 1911, the nation's first military aviation school was opened at College Park, with newly trained pilots then-Lt. Henry H. Arnold and Lt. Thomas DeWitt Milling as Wright pilot instructors and Capt. Paul W. Beck as the Curtiss instructor. William Starling Burgess also brought a licensed Wright Model B named the Burgess Model F. The military aviation school saw numerous aviation firsts. Shortly following the cancellation of an international air meet at the airport in the fall of 1912, all aviators on the field participated in a demonstration for the International Congress of Hygiene participants.

On October 7, 1912, Bernetta Adams Miller became the first woman to demonstrate a flight in a military aircraft.

In 1915 Cecil Peoli, one of the world's first professional aviators, died testing his 12-cylinder Rausenburger-powered biplane at College Park in preparation for New York and St. Louis cross country flights.

In 1918, after a three-month trial with the War Department beginning May 15, the Post Office Department inaugurated the first Postal Airmail Service from College Park, serving Philadelphia and New York City (Belmont Park). Flights from College Park continued until 1921. The compass rose and original airmail hangar remain at the modern airport as a witness to this history. The airport code "CGS" originally referred to the airport's purpose in the 1930s as an airmail station (CGS = ColleGe Station).

In 1920, Emile and Henry Berliner (father and son) brought their theories of vertical flight to the field and in 1924 made the first controlled helicopter flight.

From 1927 until 1933, the National Bureau of Standards developed and tested the first radio navigational aids for use in "blind" or bad weather flying. This was the forerunner of the modern Instrument Landing System used today by aircraft.

In 1937, the Engineering & Research Corporation (ERCO), based across the street (Good Luck Rd, now Campus Drive) in nearby Riverdale, Maryland, used the airport to test fly the early model of the Ercoupe, an airplane designed to be spin-proof.

George Brinckerhoff took over management of the Airfield and ran it from 1927 until 1959, hosting numerous airshows and teaching hundreds of pilots to fly during his tenure.

The Maryland-National Capital Park and Planning Commission (M-NCPPC) purchased the Airport in 1973 and it was added to the National Register of Historic Places in 1977. A small museum was established in 1981 drawing 400–500 visitors on a weekend. Today it is run as both a historic site and operating airport whose history is depicted in the 27,000 sq ft (2,500 m^{2}) College Park Aviation Museum.

Since the 9/11 attacks, and owing to the airport's proximity to the national capital, the operations of the airport have been severely restricted by the Transportation Security Administration in the interest of national security, but civilian pilots are still free to use the airport after going through a one-time background check procedure.

In 2015, Southern Management Corporation proposed a 233-foot (71 m), 13-story hotel on University of Maryland property in the approach path of the airport. The project was approved by the county but exceeded a 198-foot (60 m) tall FAA limit for a building at location in the flight path, prompting a redesign as a 10-story hotel. Ground was broken for the hotel later in 2015 and opened in 2017.

In 2022, Tailwind Air announced plans to begin a scheduled flight service from College Park to Skyport Marina, on Manhattan's East Side, on board a Cessna Grand Caravan. Service was set to begin on September 13, but service was delayed due to security concerns from the Transportation Security Administration and the Federal Aviation Administration.

== Facilities ==
=== Airport facilities ===
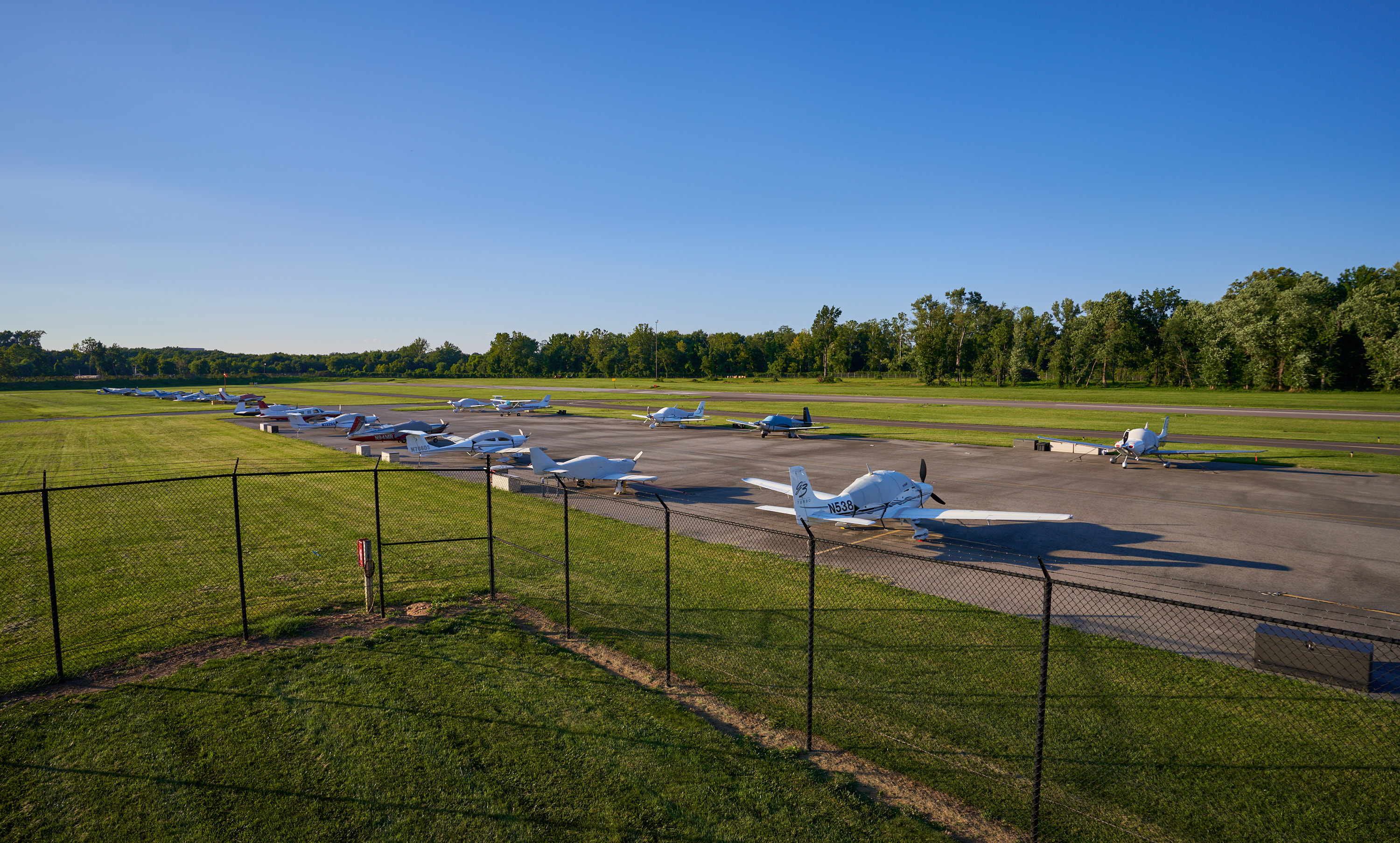
Planes parked at the College Park airport with the runway on the background.

College Park Airport covers 70 acres (28 ha) and has one runway:

- Runway 15/33: 2,980 by 60 feet (908 m × 18 m), Surface: Asphalt

The road to the airport is named in honor of Corporal Frank S. Scott, who was the first US enlisted man to die in a military aircraft, an accident which occurred at this airfield.

=== College Park Aviation Museum ===
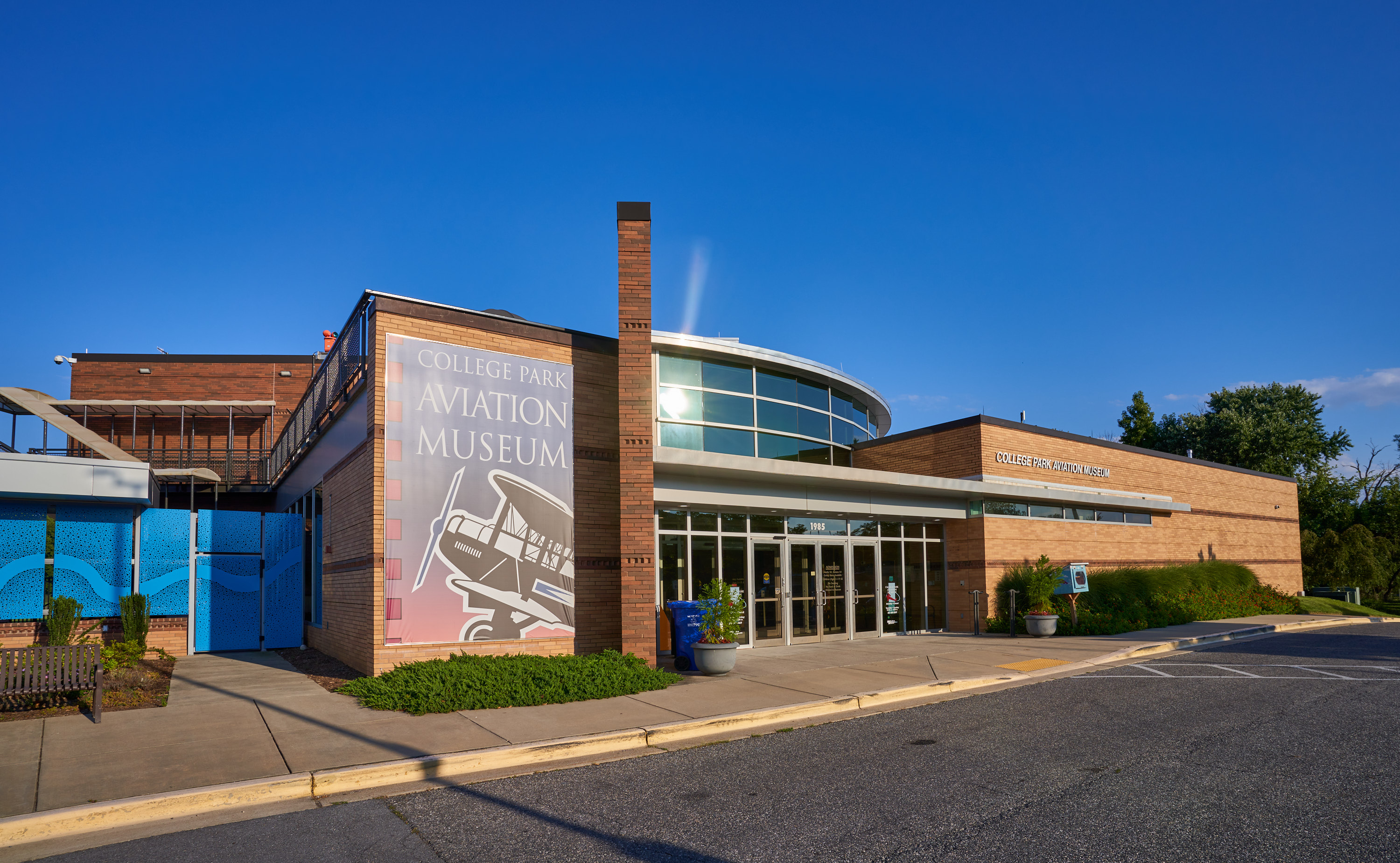
The outside of the College Park Aviation museum.

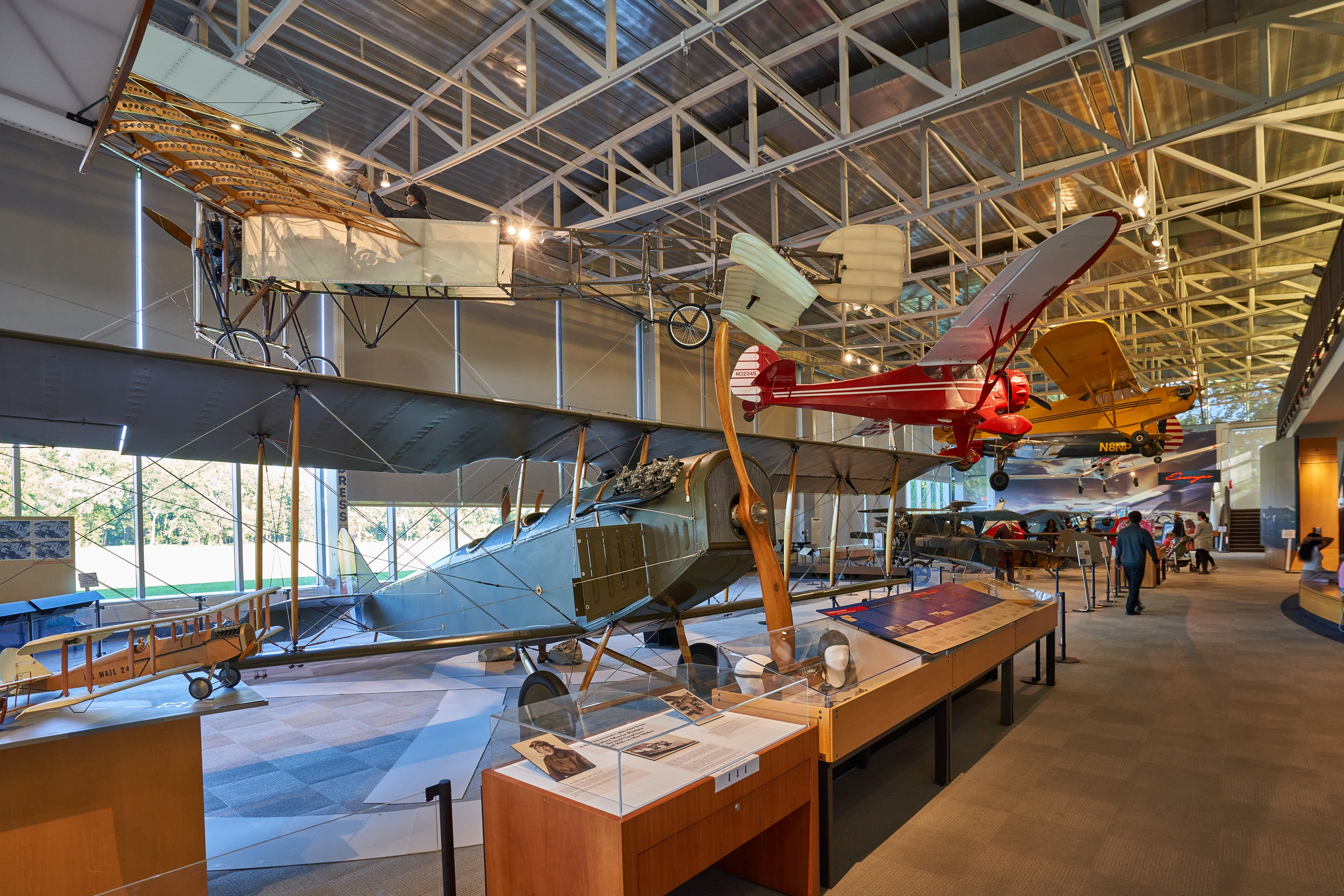
Aircraft on exhibit inside of the College Park Aviation museum.

The College Park Aviation Museum first opened to the public in 1981, and houses antique and reproduction aircraft associated with the history of College Park Airport. The current museum building opened on September 12, 1998. It includes a 90-seat auditorium, a non-circulating appointment-only library, gift shop, museum offices, and a replica of the original 1909 College Park Airport hangar, in addition to a main hangar with aircraft and exhibits on display. Artifacts and hands-on activities highlight the aviators, aircraft builders and airplanes that operated at the airport. Aircraft on display are:

- Berliner Helicopter No. 5
- Blériot XI (replica)
- Boeing-Stearman Model 75
- Curtiss JN-4D
- Curtiss Model D (replica)
- ERCO 415D Ercoupe
- Monocoupe 110
- Taylor J-2
- Taylorcraft BL-65
- Wright Model B (replica)

The museum offers rotating exhibits, special events, lectures, workshops and programs for the public, schools and groups. There are also an extensive library and archives which hold materials relating to the airport's history, early aviation history, especially relating to Maryland, and general aeronautics including related children's books. The museum is an affiliate of the Smithsonian Institution. It is owned and operated by the Maryland-National Capital Park and Planning Commission.

== See also ==
- List of airports in Maryland
