= Henry Berliner =

American aviation pioneer (1895-1970)

Henry Adler Berliner
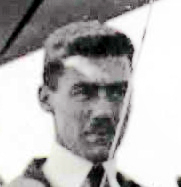
- Born: 13 December 1895; Washington D.C.
- Died: May 1, 1970 (aged 74); Washington D.C.
- Resting place: Rock Creek Cemetery; Washington D.C.
- Education: Massachusetts Institute of Technology
- Employer: ERCO
- Known for: Ercoupe
- Spouse: Josephine Mitchell
- Children: Henry Berliner Jr., Cora Anne Cunningham, Josephine Louise Vargas
- Parent(s): Emile Berliner, Cora Adler

Henry Adler Berliner (December 13, 1895 – May 1, 1970) was an American aircraft and helicopter pioneer known for designing the Berliner Helicopter.

== Life ==
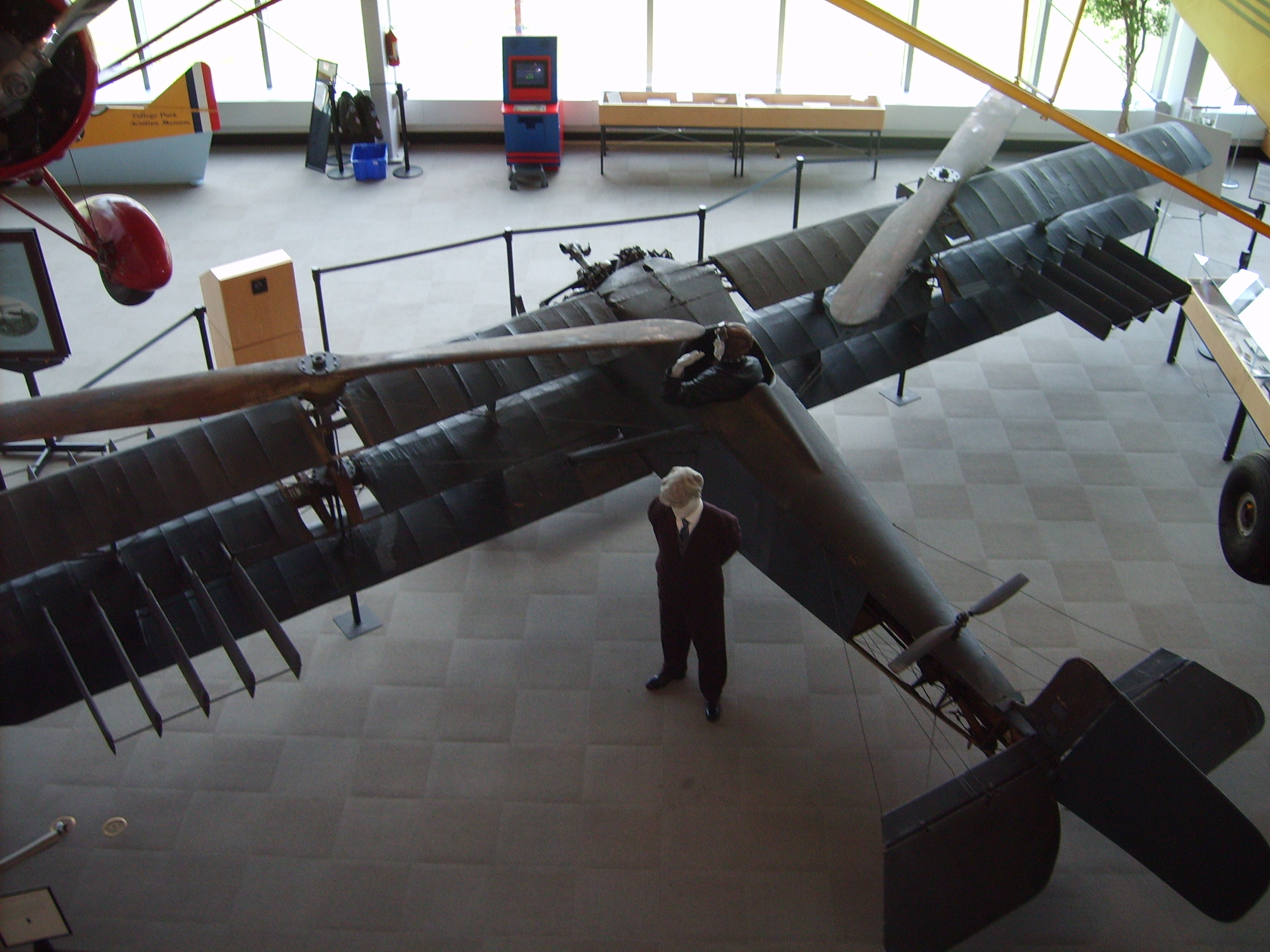
Berliner Helicopter No. 5 (1924), as on exhibit in College Park, Md.

Sixth son of inventor Emile Berliner, he was born in Washington, D.C. He studied mechanical engineering at Cornell University for two years before attending Massachusetts Institute of Technology. After a short time as aerial photographer with the Army Air Service, in 1919 he moved back to Washington to help his father with the helicopter research that had been underway for many years (since 1903 New International Encyclopedia).

Berliner being steadied in helicopter at CPA in 1920

Using a Le Rhône engine of 80 hp mounted on a test stand, Berliner was able to hover and move forward, but only with assistants holding on to stabilize the contraption. In 1922, he bought a surplus Nieuport 23 fighter's fuselage, added a Bentley 220 hp engine on the front, and connected it by geared shafts to two horizontal rotors mounted on a truss extending sideways from the fuselage. A third horizontal rotor at the rear provided pitch control. This was demonstrated at College Park, Maryland to the U.S. Navy's Bureau of Aeronautics on June 16, 1922, and is often given (though disputed) as the debut of the helicopter.

In 1923, Berliner added a triple set of wings to his prototype, as a backup in case of engine failure. This machine could both hover, and reach forward speeds of 40 mph (64 km/h), but did not have the power to gain much altitude; its best performance, on February 23, 1924, reached an elevation of just 15 feet (4.6 m).

A 1925 biplane-like design was lighter and more efficient, but performed little better and was the Berliners' last experiment. However, it did garner international interest and Berliner displayed the craft in the UK. In the following year, Henry founded the Berliner Aircraft Company and went on develop the CM-4 family of aircraft which were parasol monoplanes that came in a variety of engine options. In 1927, Henry bought Hoover Field the site of present-day Ronald Reagan Washington National Airport. However, a fire in 1928 forced Berliner to sell the Airfield and the Potomac Flying Service, which flew out of Hoover Field. The company merged to form Berliner-Joyce Aircraft in 1929 and was acquired by North American Aviation a few months later. It was also in 1929 when construction began on a new factory for Berliner-Joyce in Dundalk, Maryland. The new factory was attached to Logan Field and came at a construction cost of $250,000, for that price the company was able to install a state of the art wind tunnel measuring 16 feet (4.9 m). However, the stock market crash of the same year made Berliner-Joyce shift from civilian designs to military contract work. The company would design multiple aircraft for the army and navy, all of which were biplanes and even though Berliner-Joyce had many contracts they never built more than 50 planes for the military. In 1930 Berliner founded Engineering and Research Corporation (ERCO). ERCO built the ERCO Ercoupe starting in 1939. During the war they produced the Ball turret used in the PB4Y-1 Liberator and the PB4Y-2 Privateer. After the war Berliner sold the rights and plans to the ercoupe and moved into the field of simulators with ERCO.

== Berliner Helicopter ==
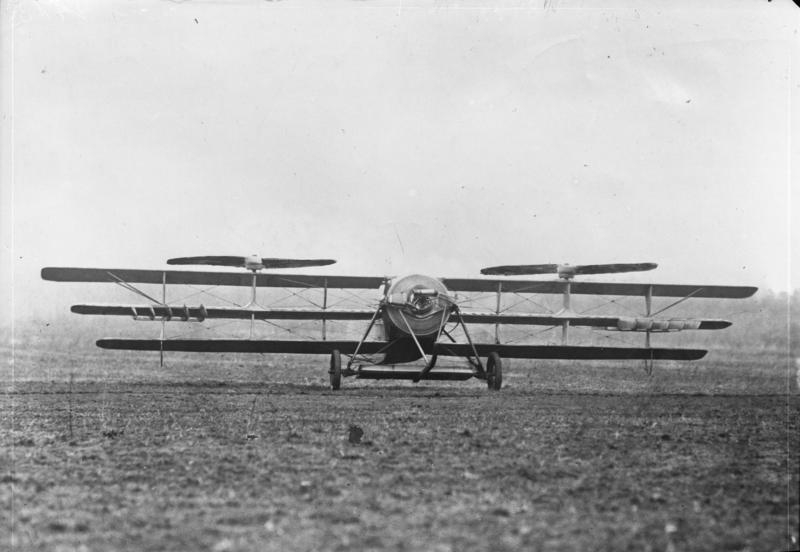
The prototype with a triple set of wings

The triplane helicopter is the oldest surviving helicopter in the world, and was donated to the Smithsonian Institution. A part of the collection at the National Air and Space Museum, it presently is on loan to the College Park Aviation Museum. he died on May 1 1970
