= Engineering and Research Corporation =

American manufacturer

Coordinates: 39°59′57″N 73°55′10″W

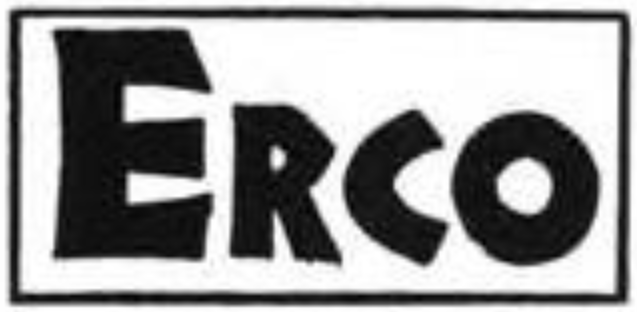
- Industry: Aerospace and defense
- Founded: 1930
- Headquarters: Riverdale, Maryland
- Key people: Henry Berliner, Fred Weick
- Products: Erco Ercoupe
- Parent: ACF

Engineering and Research Corporation (ERCO) was started by Henry Berliner in 1930. Berliner was the son of Emile Berliner, who had patented numerous inventions relating to sound and acoustics, and pioneer of helicopter development with the experimental Berliner Helicopter.

The younger Berliner founded ERCO to produce tools for the manufacture of metal aircraft and propellers. He founded the company in a shed at 2014 5th Street NW Washington D.C. Berliner met Fred Weick, an aeronautical engineer, who worked with National Advisory Committee for Aeronautics in cowlings and propellers on a 1926 while developing the propellers for the USS Akron. Weick also worked on an experimental aircraft that incorporated the up-to-date safety features.

In 1935, the company moved to 6100 Sligo Blvd.

In 1936, Weick left NACA to work for ERCO on his "safety airplane". In 1937, Berliner purchased 50 acres of land in Riverdale, Maryland near the College Park Airport and built the large ERCO factory and airstrip. One of ERCO's most significant achievements was the development of the Ercoupe aircraft.

The first experimental model of the Ercoupe was test-flown at College Park airport in 1937. It had a single tail (unlike the eventual production Ercoupes, with their characteristic twin tails) and was known as the "Jeep". In late 1938, ERCO searched unsuccessfully for a suitable engine for its new airplane. ERCO hired Harold Morehouse, former engineer in charge of small engine design at Continental Motors, to design a new engine. He came up with the inverted, in-line I-L 116, which provided good pilot visibility and enhanced aircraft streamlining. ERCO installed the I-L 116 in the prototype Ercoupe Model 310 in 1939. The engine performed well, but ERCO discontinued it when Continental introduced the A-65 engine in 1940, which generated comparable horsepower at half the cost. Construction of the production prototype was completed in 1939, and certification by the CAA was completed in 1940. The first Ercoupe, serial No. 1, was owned by George Brinckerhoff, the operator of the College Park Airport, and flown there. It now is at the National Air and Space Museum.

During World War II, the ERCO factory made several products under contract with the U.S. government, including gun turrets. ERCO earned an "E" award for excellence in meeting manufacturing goals in its war contracts.

In 1947, Berliner decided to leave the aviation industry and sold the drawings, tools, parts, materials and distribution rights for the Ercoupe to Sanders Aviation, although the small aircraft market had fallen into decline.

In all, ERCO and Sanders Aviation sold just over 5,000 Ercoupes.

In 1948, ERCO started producing aircraft simulators, becoming its main line of business. In November 1954, ERCO became part of ACF.
