= De Havilland Gipsy Minor =

1930s British piston aircraft engine

Gipsy Minor
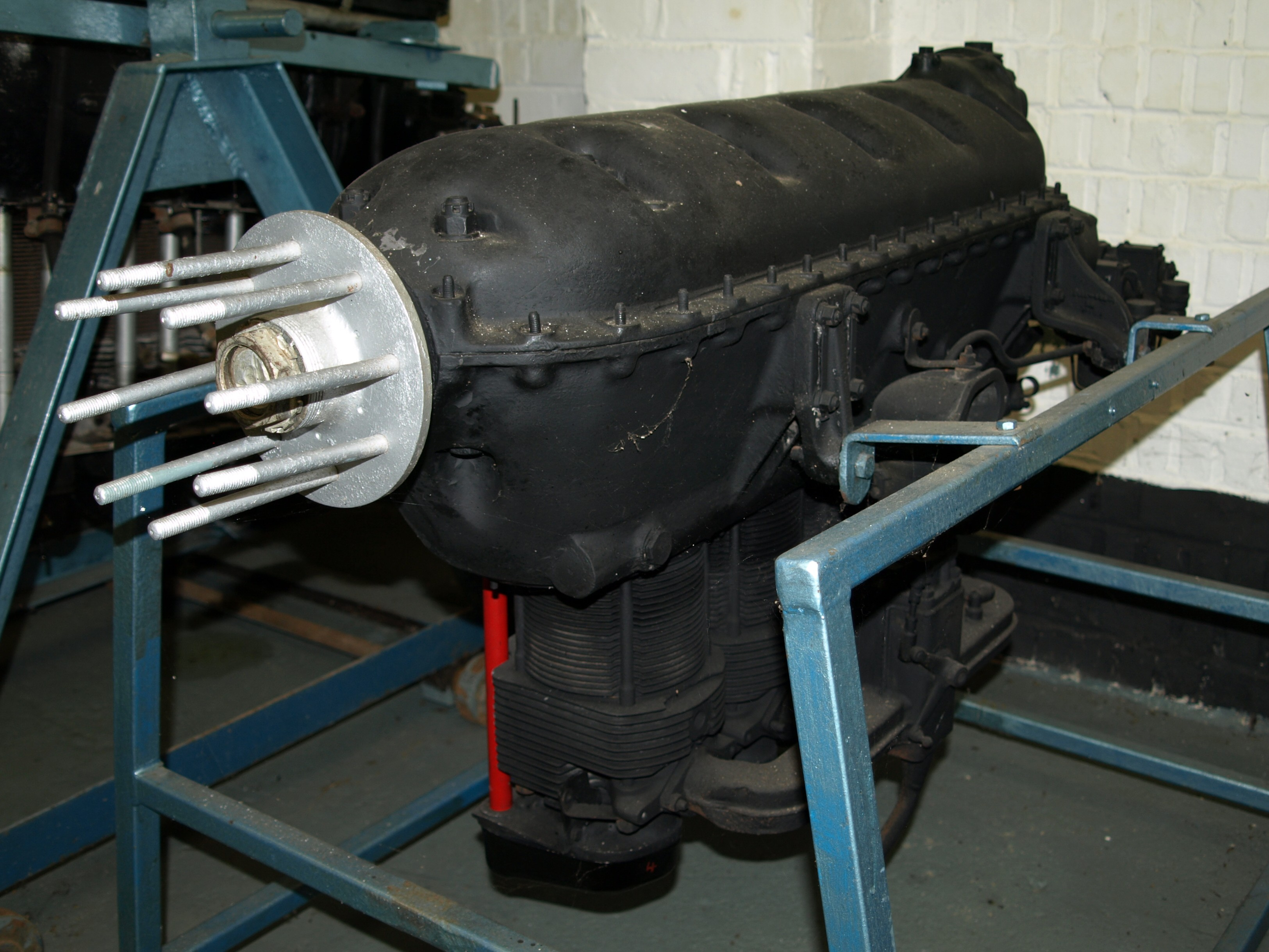
- de Havilland Gipsy Minor at the de Havilland Aircraft Heritage Centre
- Type: Piston inline aero-engine
- Manufacturer: de Havilland Engine Company
- First run: 1937
- Major applications: de Havilland Moth Minor; Short Scion
- Number built: 171
- Developed from: de Havilland Gipsy

The de Havilland Gipsy Minor or Gipsy Junior is a British four-cylinder, air-cooled, inline engine that was used primarily in the de Havilland Moth Minor monoplane, both products being developed in the late 1930s.

== Design and development ==
The engine was a simplified and smaller version of the earlier de Havilland Gipsy. It featured only one magneto where dual ignition was normal for the Gipsy series of engines. A total of 171 engines were produced, including 100 built in Australia as production moved to that country due to the start of the Second World War.

== Applications ==
- De Havilland Moth Minor
- Short Scion
- Druine Turbi

== Engines on display ==
- A de Havilland Gipsy Minor engine is on public display at the de Havilland Aircraft Heritage Centre, London Colney, Hertfordshire.

== Specifications (Gipsy Minor) ==
Data from

=== General characteristics ===
- Type: 4-cylinder air-cooled inverted inline piston aircraft engine
- Bore: 4.016 in (102 mm)
- Stroke: 4.528 in (115 mm)
- Displacement: 229.29 in³ (3.759 L)
- Dry weight: 216 lb (98 kg)

=== Components ===
- Valvetrain: Overhead valve
- Fuel type: Minimum 70 octane petrol
- Oil system: Dry sump, gear-type pump
- Cooling system: Air-cooled

=== Performance ===
- Power output: 90 hp at 2,600 rpm
- Compression ratio: 6:1
- Power-to-weight ratio: 0.41 hp/lb

== See also ==
- de Havilland Aircraft Heritage Centre
- Frank Halford

Related development

- de Havilland Gipsy

Comparable engines

- Argus As 8
- Blackburn Cirrus Midget
- Blackburn Cirrus Minor
- ERCO I-L 116
- Hirth HM 504
- Walter Mikron

Related lists

- List of aircraft engines
