= Stinson 108 =

Single-engine high-wing monoplane, 1946-1950

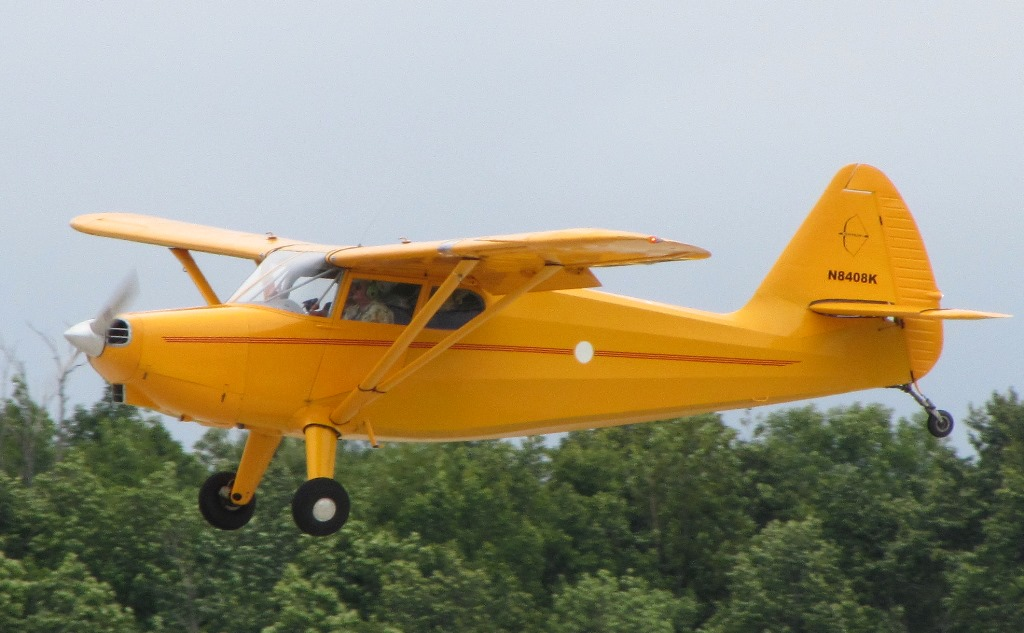
- 1946 Stinson 108-1

General information
- Type: Private owner aircraft
- National origin: United States
- Manufacturer: Stinson Aircraft Company
- Number built: 5,260

History
- Manufactured: 1946-1950
- First flight: December 1, 1944
- Developed from: Stinson Voyager

The Stinson 108 is a popular single-engine, four-seat, light general aviation aircraft produced by the Stinson division of the American airplane company Consolidated Vultee, from immediately after World War II to 1950 (by which time Stinson was a division of Piper Aircraft). The 108 was developed from the prewar Model 10A Voyager (also known as the "Stinson 105").

First built in 1946 – as a stretched derivative of the Model 10A / 105 Voyager – more than 5,000 of the model 108 Voyager (or Station Wagon) were produced by Stinson, before the company was acquired by Piper Aircraft in late 1948.

When Piper took over the 108 line, a number of model 108s (Note: Estimates ranging from 125 to 500.) built by Stinson were completed, but unsold, and went to Piper as part of the acquisition. Piper then sold that inventory as the Piper-Stinson over the next few years. Some reports appear to indicate that 108 production and/or sales continued under Piper until 1949, 1950 or 1951.

In all, 5,260 Stinson (or Piper-Stinson) 108s were reportedly built (Note: One source says all serial numbers above 4231 are Piper-built.) Most models were named "Voyager" (like the preceding 10A/105), but some were named "Station Wagon," reflecting interior modifications to accommodate cargo.

== Design and development ==
The single-engine, four-seat, fixed-gear, high-wing, Stinson 108 series was built with a six-cylinder Franklin engine -- 150 horsepower (110 kW) 6A4-150, or 165 horsepower (123 kW) 6A4-165, normally -- driving a fixed-pitch propeller.

The fuselage is of fabric-covered steel tube. Aftermarket modifiers have obtained supplemental type certificates (STC) allowing conversion to an aluminum covering. Many different engines have been installed in the 108 by STC such as the Lycoming O-360, Franklin O-350, Continental O-470.

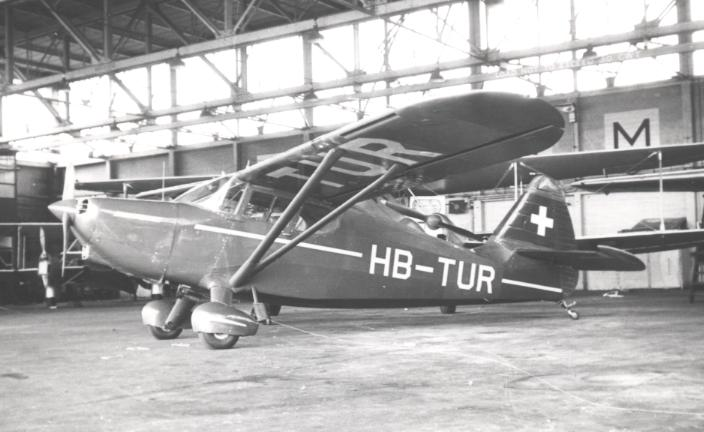
Swiss Stinson 108-2 at Manchester Airport, England in 1950. This earlier model has the shorter vertical fin with curved trailing edge.

One distinctive feature is the partial leading edge slot installed on the wings and aligned with the ailerons on the trailing edge, ensuring that the portion of the wing containing the aileron remains unstalled at higher angles of attack, thus contributing to docile stall behavior.

The 108 initially proved popular, with 746 examples built in 1946, while production in 1947 was almost half of all 4-seat private aircraft built in the United States, with the Stinson division the only part of Convair that was profitable for a time.

In 1948, however, overproduction in the US general aviation industry led to a glut of light aircraft, with unsold 108s being stored, and on 30 June 1948, Convair shut down the Stinson factory. The name and assets of Stinson (including 200 unsold 108s) were sold to Piper Aircraft on 1 December 1948, with Piper setting up a Stinson division in April 1949 to sell the complete aircraft inherited from Convair, and to assemble a further 125 aircraft from spare parts. These aircraft were marketed as Piper-Stinson 108s.

Total new production of the Stinson Model 108, by Stinson, was 5,260; this total does not include the two converted prototypes. Stinson delivered approximately 4,935 aircraft and Piper delivered approximately 325 aircraft. Piper later sold the type certificate to Univair Aircraft Corporation. Univair built and certified the model 108-5, but built only one example. Total new model production by Stinson and Univair was 5,261 aircraft.

== Variants ==
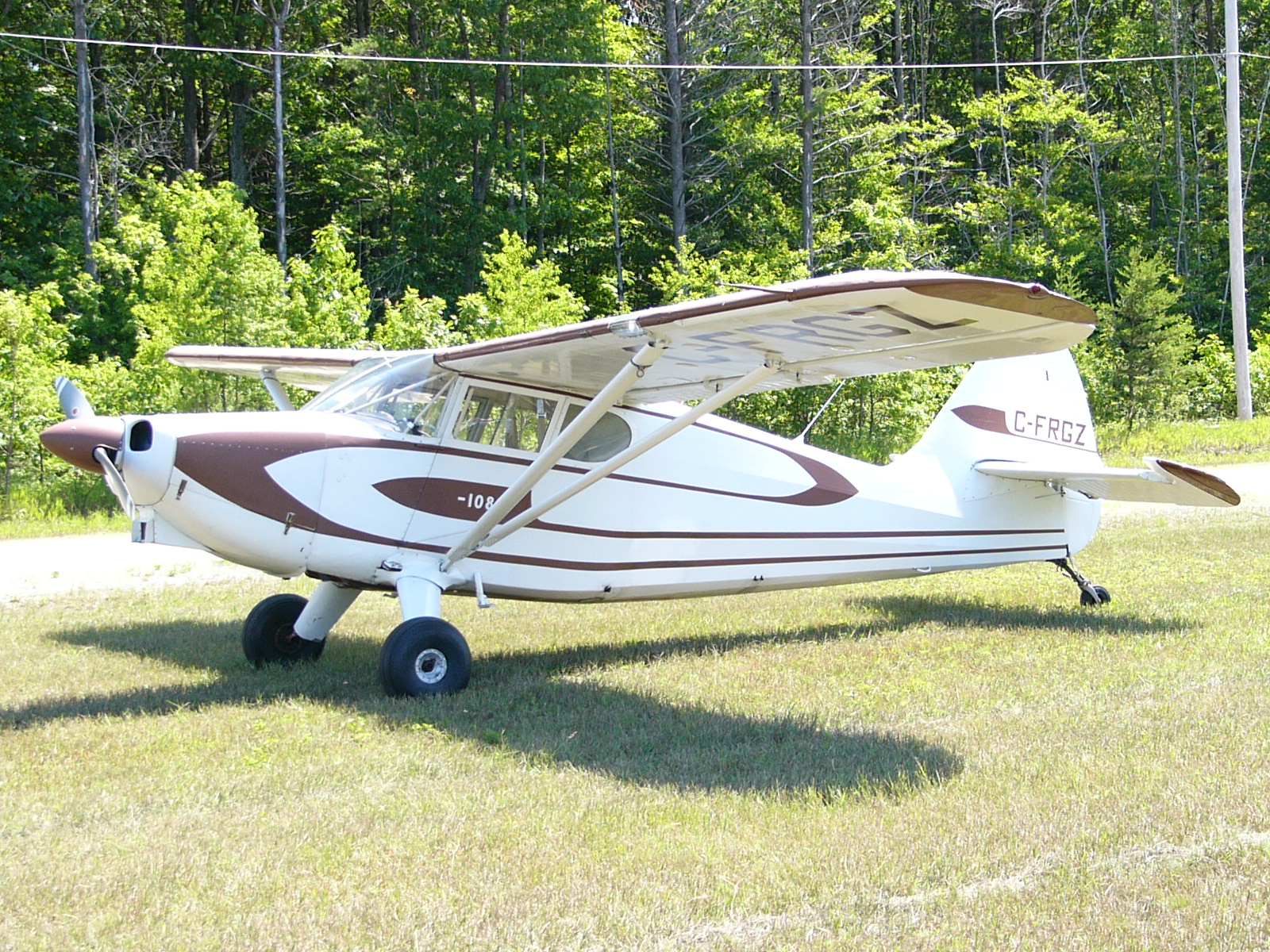
1946 model Stinson 108 (not a 108-1, 2 or 3)

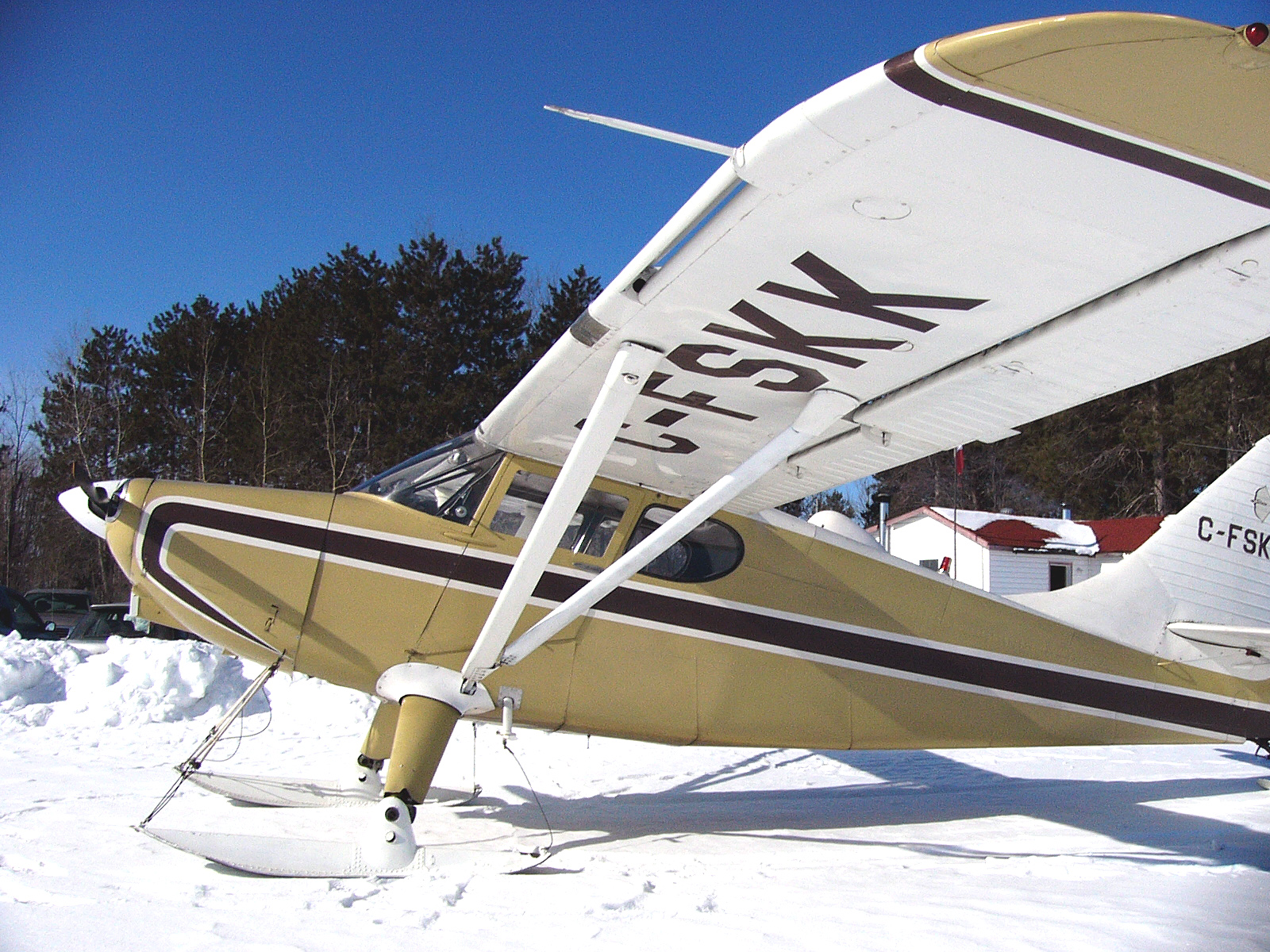
A Canadian 1949 model Stinson 108-3 on skis. The partial span leading edge slot is visible.

The 108 variants closely resemble each other but can be visually distinguished by their design changes:

Prototype 108
Two prototype model 108s were converted from Stinson model 10A airframes. FAA records show NX31519 was model 108 serial number 1, and NX31532 is model 108 serial number 2. Both registrations later changed to NC. The production model straight 108 would also use serial number 1 and 2, so there was for a short period 2 duplicate serial numbers;
108 Voyager 125
Powered by a 125 hp (93 kW) Lycoming O-235 piston engine.
108 Voyager 150
Powered by a 150 hp (112 kW) Franklin 6A4-150-B31, B3 or B4 piston engine. 742 built in 1946.
108-1
Slightly modified version with external baggage door. 1508 built 1947–1948.
108-2
Powered by 165 hp (123 kW) Franklin 6A4-165-B3 or -B5. 1250 built from May 1948. There was a conversion kit to add the rudder trim to the earlier airplanes advertised.

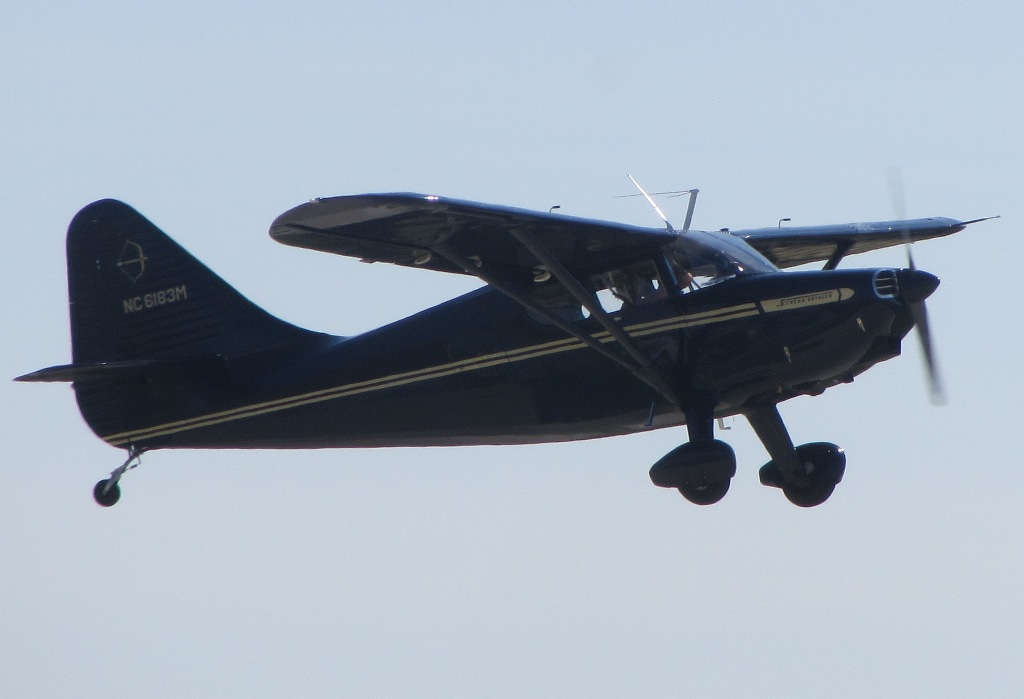
Stinson 108-3

108-3
The 108-3 introduced a taller vertical fin with a rudder featuring a straight trailing edge. Larger fuel tanks (50 U.S. gallons (190 L; 42 imp gal) versus 40 U.S. gallons (150 L; 33 imp gal)) were also fitted. The -3 has a higher gross weight than its predecessors of 2,400 lb (1,089 kg). 1760 built by Stinson and Piper.
108-4
The 108-4 is a higher powered model 108, sn 108-4693, NX149C, not certified, flown experimentally by Stinson, later by Piper, 1 built.
Flying Station Wagon
The "Flying Station Wagon" version was an option available with the -1, -2 and -3 models, had a utility interior incorporated wood panelling and a reinforced floor, allowing 600 lb (272 kg) of baggage in the passenger compartment. The aircraft could be fitted with wheel, float or ski landing gear. The single 108-4 built was a Flying Station Wagon.
108-5
A single 108-5 was built by Univair, who purchased the Stinson 108 type certificate from Piper, in 1964. The 108-5 used a 180 hp (134 kW) Franklin 6A-335-B1 engine. Univair offered kits to convert earlier aircraft to this standard. The 108-5 brought total model 108 production to 5,261, of which 5,135 were built by Stinson, 125 by Piper, and 1 by Univair.

== Operators ==
Spain

- Spanish Air Force operated eighteen 108-3 aircraft, with the designation L.2.

== Specifications (108 Voyager 150) ==
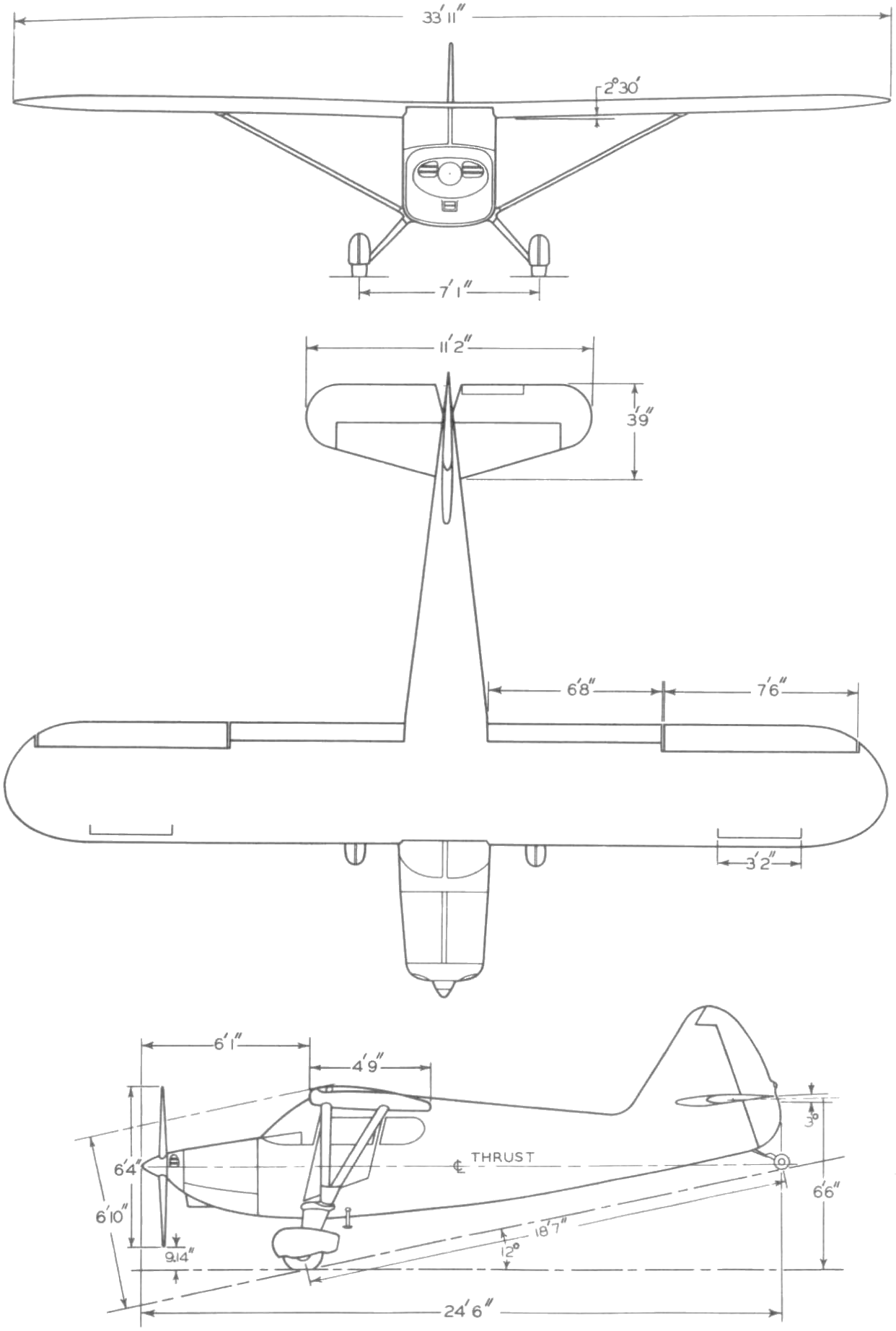
3-view silhouette drawing of the Stinson Voyager 150

Data from Plane and Pilot, Jane's all the World's Aircraft 1947, Stinson Operating Manual.

General characteristics

- Crew: one
- Capacity: three passengers
- Length: 24 ft 6 in (7.46 m)
- Wingspan: 33 ft 11 in (10.33 m)
- Height: 6 ft 10 in (2.08 m)
- Wing area: 155 sq ft (14.4 m^{2})
- Aspect ratio: 7.14
- Airfoil: NACA 4412
- Empty weight: 1,206 lb (547 kg)
- Gross weight: 2,150 lb (975 kg)
- Fuel capacity: 40 US gallons (150 L; 33 imp gal)
- Powerplant: 1 × Franklin 6A4 150-B3 six cylinder air-cooled horizontally opposed four stroke piston engine, 150 hp (110 kW)
- Propellers: 2-bladed Sensenich, 6 ft 4 in (1.93 m) diameter fixed pitch wooden airscrew

Performance

- Maximum speed: 125 mph (201 km/h, 109 kn)
- Cruise speed: 121 mph (195 km/h, 105 kn)
- Landing speed: 75 mph (65 kn; 121 km/h)
- Stall speed: 61 mph (98 km/h, 53 kn)
- Never exceed speed: 148 mph (238 km/h, 129 kn)
- Range: 500 mi (800 km, 430 nmi)
- Service ceiling: 14,000 ft (4,300 m)
- Rate of climb: 770 ft/min (3.9 m/s)
- Wing loading: 13.8 lb/sq ft (67 kg/m^{2})
- Power/mass: 14.33 lb/hp (8.69 kg/kW)
- Take-off run: 549 ft (167 m)

== See also ==
Related development

- Stinson Voyager

Aircraft of comparable role, configuration, and era

- Aeronca Sedan
- Cessna 170
