= Blackburn Cirrus Midget =

1930s British piston aircraft engine

Cirrus Midget
- Type: Air-cooled 4-cylinder inline piston engine
- National origin: United Kingdom
- Manufacturer: Blackburn Aircraft
- First run: 1937
- Major applications: Chilton D.W.1

The Blackburn Cirrus Midget was a British four-cylinder, inverted, inline air-cooled aero engine designed and built in 1937 by the Cirrus Engine Section of Blackburn Aircraft Limited. Little is known of its development and use, its sole aircraft application being reported as the Chilton D.W.1 although it is possible that this did not transpire.

== Specifications (Cirrus Midget) ==
Data from Lumsden

=== General characteristics ===
- Type: Air-cooled inverted inline four-cylinder piston engine
- Bore: 85 mm (3.35 in)
- Stroke: 100 mm (3.94 in)
- Displacement: 2.27 L (138.5 cu in)
- Length: 33.6 in (853 mm)
- Width: 14.18 in (360 mm)
- Height: 21.65 in (550 mm)
- Dry weight: 155 lb (70 kg)

=== Components ===
- Valvetrain: Overhead poppet valve, one inlet and one exhaust valve per cylinder
- Fuel system: Single downdraught carburettor
- Fuel type: 87 octane petrol
- Cooling system: Air-cooled
- Reduction gear: Direct drive, left hand tractor

=== Performance ===
- Power output: 55 hp (41 kW) at 2,600 rpm (maximum power)
- Specific power: 0.35 hp/cu in (6.5 kW/L)
- Compression ratio: 6:1
- Power-to-weight ratio: 0.35 hp/lb (0.58 kW/kg)

== See also ==
Comparable engines

- de Havilland Gipsy Minor
- ERCO I-L 116
- Hirth HM 504
- Walter Mikron
- Walter Minor

Related lists

- List of aircraft engines
