= Stinson Voyager =

1940s American light utility monoplane

Voyager
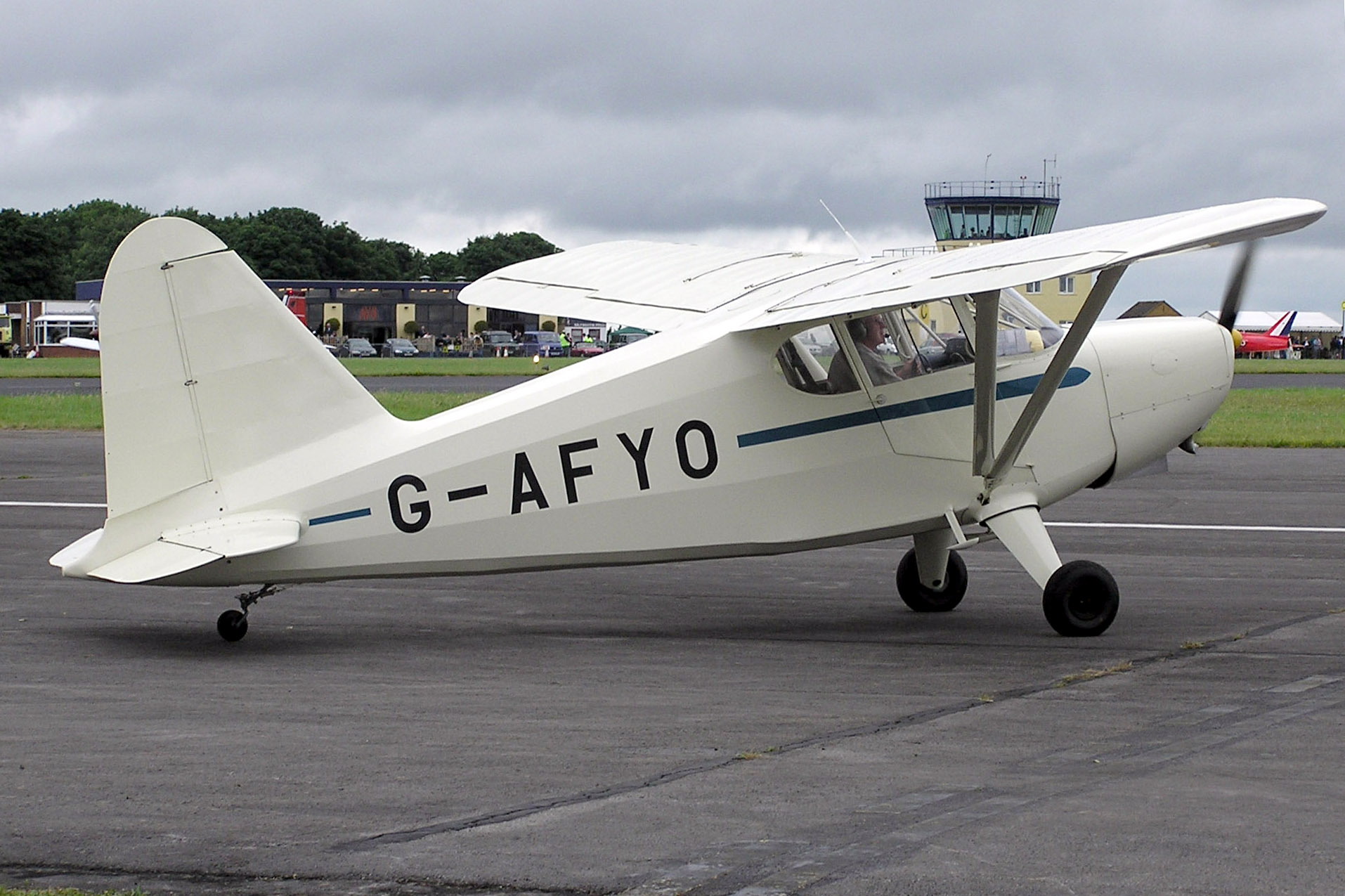
- Model 105 in 2005

General information
- Type: Light utility monoplane
- National origin: United States
- Manufacturer: Stinson Aircraft Company
- Primary user: United States Army
- Number built: 277 (Model 105); 775 (Model 10)

History
- First flight: 1939
- Variant: Stinson Model 108

The Stinson Voyager was an American light utility monoplane built during the 1940s by the Stinson Aircraft Company.

== Development ==
First developed as the Stinson HW-75 and marketed as the Model 105 in 1939, the design was a high-wing three-seat braced monoplane powered by either a 75-hp (63.4-Kw) Continental A-75 or an 80-hp (67.7-Kw) Continental A-80-6. This was developed into the Model 10, introduced in 1940, powered by a Continental A-80 piston engine. The Model 10 introduced wider seats as well as an improved standard for the interior and finish. In 1941 the Model 10 was followed by the Model 10A, powered by a Franklin 4AC-199 engine and the Model 10B with a Lycoming GO-145. Both had a slightly widened cabin. The 10A was the last of the series, but the first to be called "Voyager", a name that was retained for the post-war Stinson 108.

Six Model 10s were evaluated by the United States Army Air Forces (USAAF) as the YO-54 in field trials held between September 1940 and January 1941. Deemed unsuitable for artillery observation, no further examples were ordered, although the military later purchased 12 model 10A Voyagers in 1942 for domestic use as couriers. In the meantime, Stinson created the Model 75B, a one-off 100 hp tandem seat version of the Model 10 that first flew in June 1940. Re-designated as the Model 75C with a 125 hp engine, the military rejected it as being under-powered and too fragile for combat use. This led Stinson to design an all-new aircraft designated Model 76, later known as the L-5 Sentinel that conformed to Army/Navy engineering handbook standards.

The twelve Model 10As were civilian-owned aircraft re-purchased by Stinson and sold to the USAAF who pressed them into service as the L-9B. Other sources state they were originally designated AT-19 but this has not been verified and is probably incorrect as this was the military designation for Stinson's model SR-10.

After World War II, the type was developed as the 4-seat Model 108, the prototype being a modified Model 10A.

== Variants ==
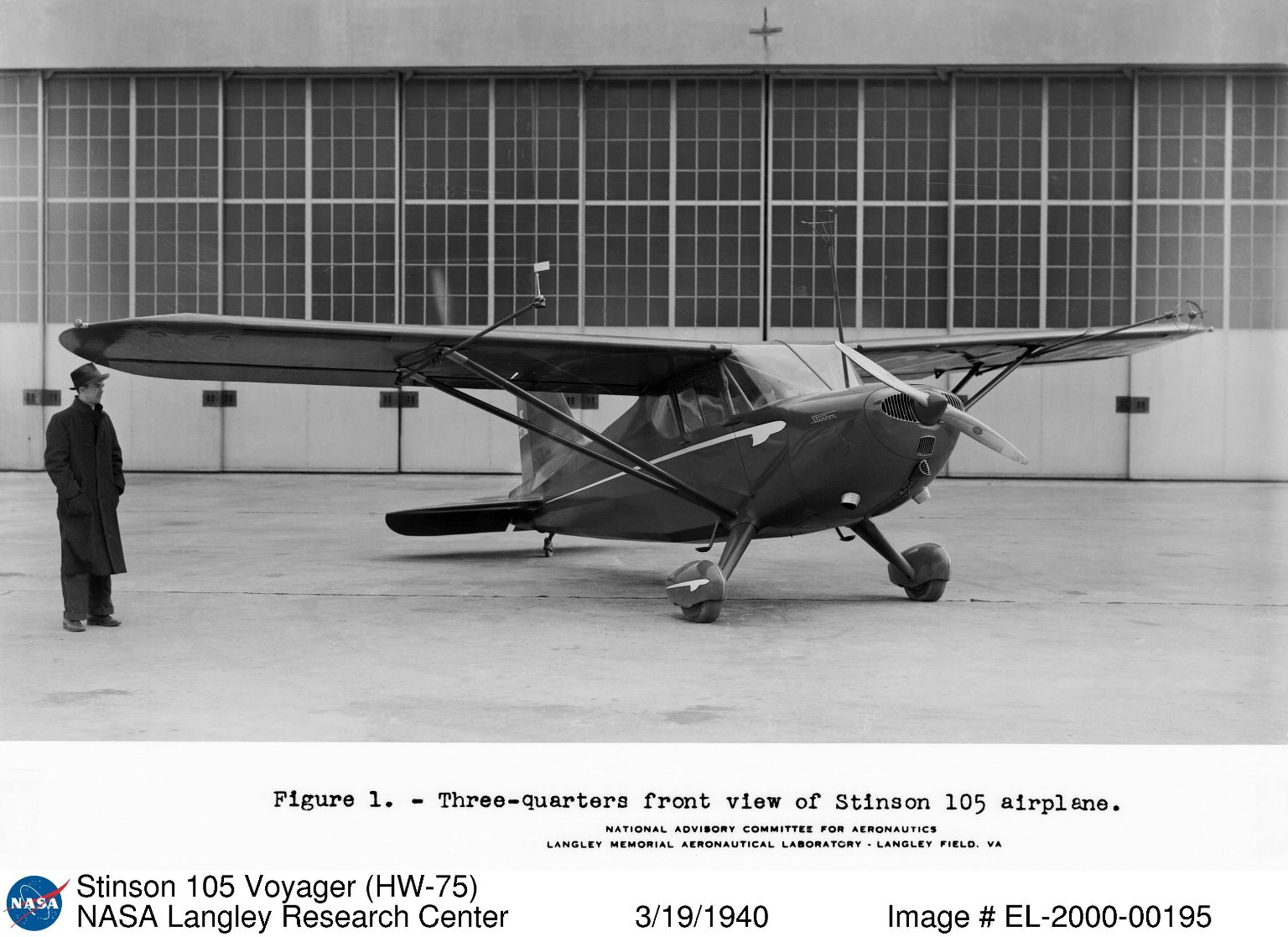
Stinson HW-75 at Langley

HW-75 (1939, marketed as Model 105)
Production variant also known as the HW-75 with a Continental A-75 engine, or HW-80 with a Continental A-80 engine, 277 built.
Model 10 (1940)
Improved production variant with an 80 hp Continental A-80 engine, 260 built.
Model 75B / 75C (1940)
Experimental tandem-seat variant with a 100 hp Lycoming, and later 125 hp Franklin engine. 1 built.
Model 10A Voyager (1941)
Variant with a 90 hp Franklin 4AC-199 engine, 515 built (10A and 10B).The first of the series to bear the Voyager name.
Model 10B (1941)
Variant with a 75 hp Lycoming GO-145 engine, 515 built (10A and 10B).
YO-54 (1940)
United States Army designation for six Model 10s for evaluation.
AT-19A
Original military designation for eight Model 105s impressed in 1942, later changed to L-9A.
AT-19B
Original designation for 12 impressed Model 10A Voyagers, later changed to L-9B.
L-9A (1942)
Final designation for eight impressed Model 105 Voyagers, originally AT-19A.
L-9B (1942)
Final designation for 12 impressed Model 10A Voyagers, originally AT-19B.

== Operators ==
Brazil

- Brazilian Air Force - Model 105

Canada

- Royal Canadian Air Force

United States

- United States Army Air Forces

== Specifications (Model 105) ==
Data from General Dynamics Aircraft and their Predecessors

General characteristics

- Crew: one
- Capacity: two passengers
- Length: 22 ft 2 in (6.76 m)
- Wingspan: 34 ft 0 in (10.36 m)
- Height: 6 ft 6 in (1.98 m)
- Wing area: 155 sq ft (14.4 m^{2})
- Airfoil: NACA 4412
- Empty weight: 923 lb (419 kg)
- Gross weight: 1,580 lb (717 kg)
- Powerplant: 1 × Continental A-75-3 air-cooled flat-four, 75 hp (56 kW)

Performance

- Maximum speed: 105 mph (169 km/h, 91 kn)
- Cruise speed: 100 mph (160 km/h, 87 kn)
- Range: 350 mi (560 km, 300 nmi)
- Service ceiling: 10,500 ft (3,200 m)
- Rate of climb: 430 ft/min (2.2 m/s)

== See also ==
Related development

- L-5 Sentinel
- Stinson 108

Related lists

- List of aircraft of World War II
- List of military aircraft of the United States

== Bibliography ==
- Andrade, John. U.S.Military Aircraft Designations and Serials since 1909. Leicester, UK: Midland Counties Publications, 1979. ISBN 0-904597-22-9.
- The Illustrated Encyclopedia of Aircraft (Part Work 1982-1985). London: Orbis Publishing, 1985.
- Morareau, Lucien (September 1998). "Les oubliées des Antilles" [The Forgotten Ones of the Antilles]. Avions: Toute l'Aéronautique et son histoire (in French) (66): 30–37. ISSN 1243-8650.
- Sapienza, Antonio Luis (June 2000). "Les premiers avions de transport commercial au Paraguay" [The First Commercial Transport Aircraft in Paraguay]. Avions: Toute l'Aéronautique et son histoire (in French) (87): 45–47. ISSN 1243-8650.
- Simpson, R.W. Airlife's General Aviation. Shrewsbory, Shrops, UK: Airlife Publishing, 1991. ISBN 1-85310-194-X.
- Wegg, John. General Dynamic Aircraft and their Predecessors. London: Putnam, 1990. ISBN 0-85177-833-X.
- Underwood, John W. The Stinsons, A Pictorial History. Heritage Press, 1976. ISBN 0911834060 and ISBN 9780911834062.
- Gray, James H. Stinson's Venerable Flying Jeep. Sentinel Owners & Pilots Association, 2021 (sentinelclub.org).
