= Alon A-4 =

Aircraft

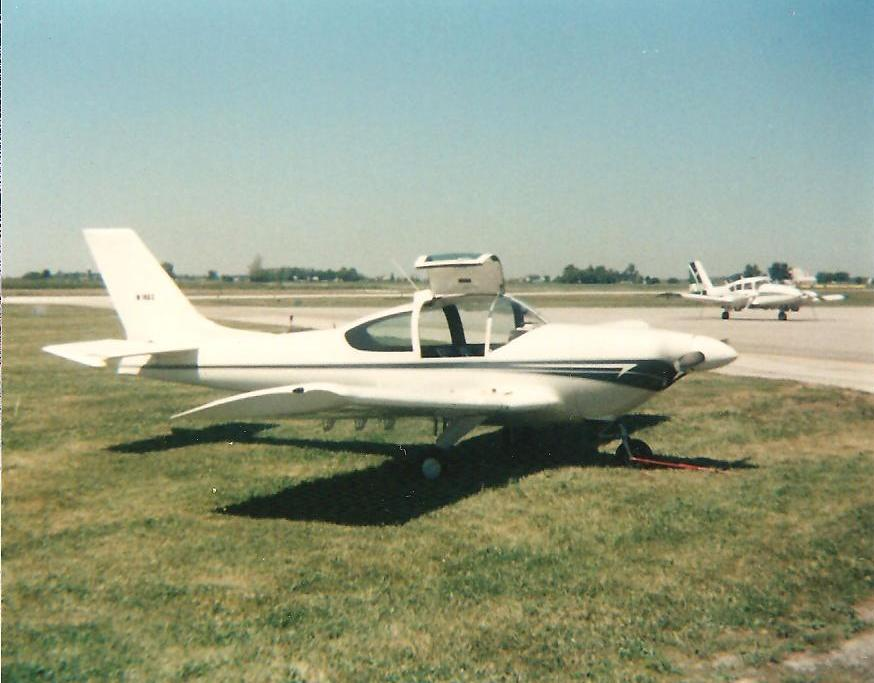
- Alon A-4 at fly-in in late 1980s

General information
- Type: Light aircraft
- National origin: United States of America
- Manufacturer: Alon Inc

History
- First flight: 25 February 1966

The Alon A-4 is a prototype American light aircraft of the 1960s. Alon INC. of McPherson, Kansas was formed by two former executives of Beechcraft in 1963 and had initially built an improved version of the ERCO Ercoupe as the Alon A-2. In 1964, Alon started design of an all-new four-seat light aircraft, the Alon Four (or Alon A-4). It was a conventional, singled-engined low-winged monoplane of all-metal construction with a fixed (non retractable) tricycle landing gear undercarriage. Alon produced one prototype, this first flying on February 25, 1966. The aircraft was never put into full production before the company was sold to Mooney aircraft.

== Specifications ==
Data from Jane's All The World's Aircraft 1966–67

General characteristics

- Crew: 1
- Capacity: 3 passengers
- Length: 23 ft 6 in (7.16 m)
- Wingspan: 32 ft 0 in (9.75 m)
- Height: 8 ft 1 in (2.46 m)
- Wing area: 160 sq ft (15 m^{2})
- Aspect ratio: 6.31:1
- Empty weight: 1,043 lb (473 kg)
- Gross weight: 2,150 lb (975 kg)
- Powerplant: 1 × Lycoming O-320-A air-cooled flat-four, 150 hp (110 kW)

Performance

- Maximum speed: 150 mph (240 km/h, 130 kn) (max cruise)
- Cruise speed: 140 mph (230 km/h, 120 kn) (econ cruise)
- Stall speed: 52 mph (84 km/h, 45 kn) (flaps down)
- Never exceed speed: 209 mph (336 km/h, 182 kn)
- Range: 750 mi (1,210 km, 650 nmi) (max payload and fuel, 45 min reserves)
- Rate of climb: 880 ft/min (4.5 m/s)
