= ERCO IL-116 =

IL-116
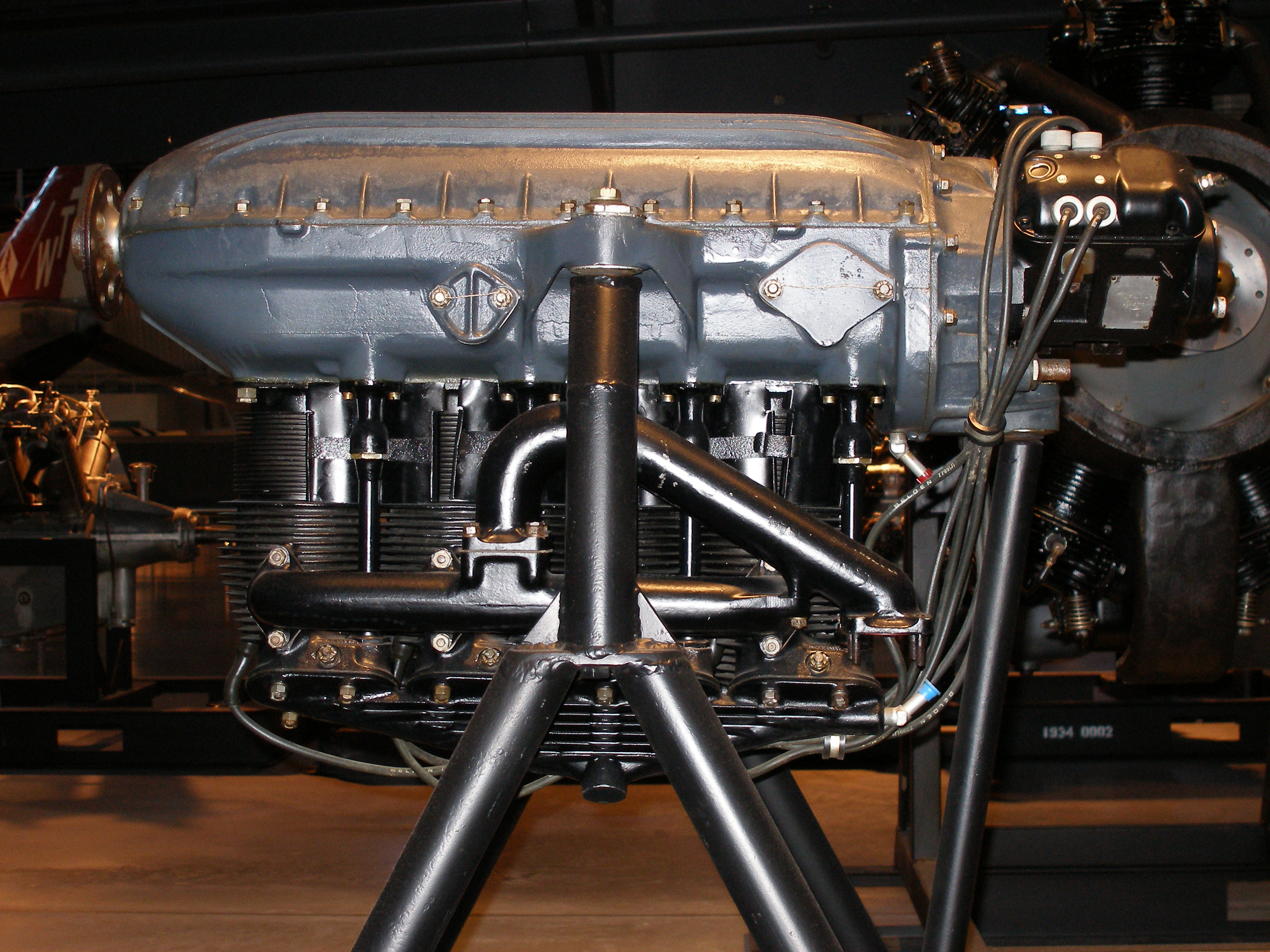
- Preserved ERCO IL-116 4-cylinder engine.
- Type: Piston inline aero-engine
- Manufacturer: Engineering and Research Corporation
- First run: 1939
- Major applications: ERCO Ercoupe
- Number built: 3

The ERCO IL-116 was an American inline aircraft engine designed and built in the late 1930s. The type was not placed into series production due to competition from cheaper engines.

== Design and development ==
In late 1938, the Engineering and Research Corporation (ERCO) searched unsuccessfully for a suitable engine for its new "safe" airplane, the Ercoupe. ERCO hired Harold Morehouse, former engineer in charge of small engine design at Continental Motors, to design a new engine. He came up with the inverted, in-line IL-116, which provided good pilot visibility and enhanced aircraft streamlining.

ERCO installed the IL-116 in the prototype Ercoupe Model 310 in 1939. The engine performed well, but ERCO discontinued it when Continental introduced the Continental A65 engine in 1940, which generated comparable horsepower at half the cost. ERCO manufactured parts for six IL-116s but only three were built.

== Engines on display ==
An ERCO IL-116, believed to be the last remaining engine, is on display at the National Air and Space Museum.

== Specifications (IL-116) ==
=== General characteristics ===
- Type: 4-cylinder air-cooled inverted inline aircraft piston engine
- Displacement: 116 in³ (1.9 L)
- Dry weight: 158 lb (71.7 kg)

=== Components ===
- Valvetrain: One intake and one exhaust valve per cylinder, pushrod-actuated.
- Fuel system: Updraft carburetor
- Fuel type: 73 octane avgas
- Oil system: Wet sump
- Cooling system: Air-cooled

=== Performance ===
- Power output: 65 hp (48.5 kW) at 3,500 RPM
- Specific power: 0.56 hp/in³ (25.5 kW/L)
- Power-to-weight ratio: 0.41 hp/lb (0.68 kW/kg)

== See also ==
Comparable engines

- Blackburn Cirrus Midget
- de Havilland Gipsy Minor
- Menasco C-4 Pirate
- Walter Mikron

Related lists

- List of aircraft engines
