= Univair Aircraft Corporation =

American aircraft manufacturer

- Industry: Aerospace
- Founded: 1946
- Founder: J.E. “Eddie” Dyer
- Headquarters: Aurora, Colorado, United States of America
- Products: Aircraft parts and services
- Number of employees: peak of 120
- Website: www.univair.com

Univair Aircraft Corporation is an American aircraft manufacturer holding the type certificate for the Stinson 108 series, and Ercoupe series aircraft, including the Forney, Alon and the Mooney M10 Cadet. The company holds parts manufacturing approvals for Aeronca Champion, Bellanca Citabria, Bellanca Decathlon, Aeronca Scout, Cessna, Luscombe, Piper and Taylorcraft.

Univair was founded in the Denver, Colorado area in February 1946 by J.E. “Eddie” Dyer and Don Vest as Vest Aircraft Company. The company initially performed flight instruction, parts and repair. In 1963, Vest was closed following the death of its founder, and was reestablished by his wife in 1966 as Univair. The company moved to a new location off airport property in 1972.

Univair has specialized in manufacturing FAA approved new parts for vintage aircraft such as the Piper Cub.

== Aircraft ==
Aircraft type certificates owned by Univair
Model name	First flight	Number built	Type
Stinson 108	1946	?	?
Ercoupe	1940	Over 6000	?

== See also ==
- Aircraft Spruce & Specialty Company
