= Berliner Helicopter =

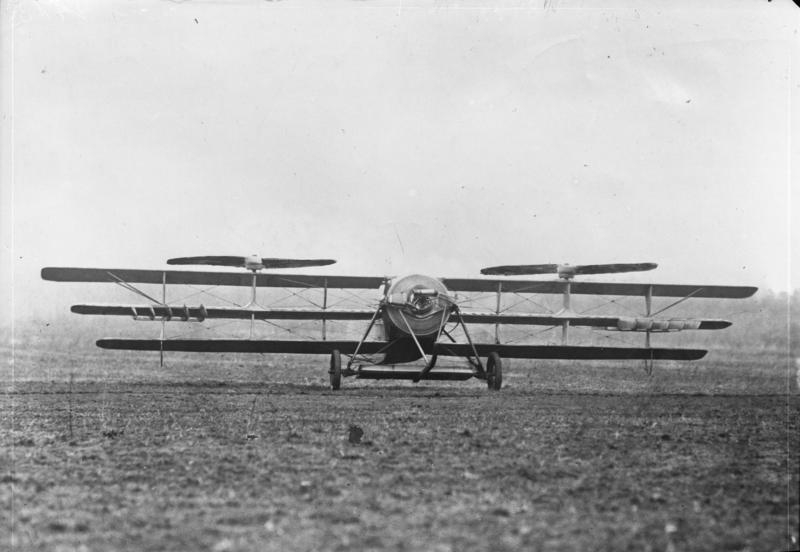
- Berliner Helicopter No. 5

General information
- Type: Helicopter
- National origin: United States of America
- Designer: Henry Berliner

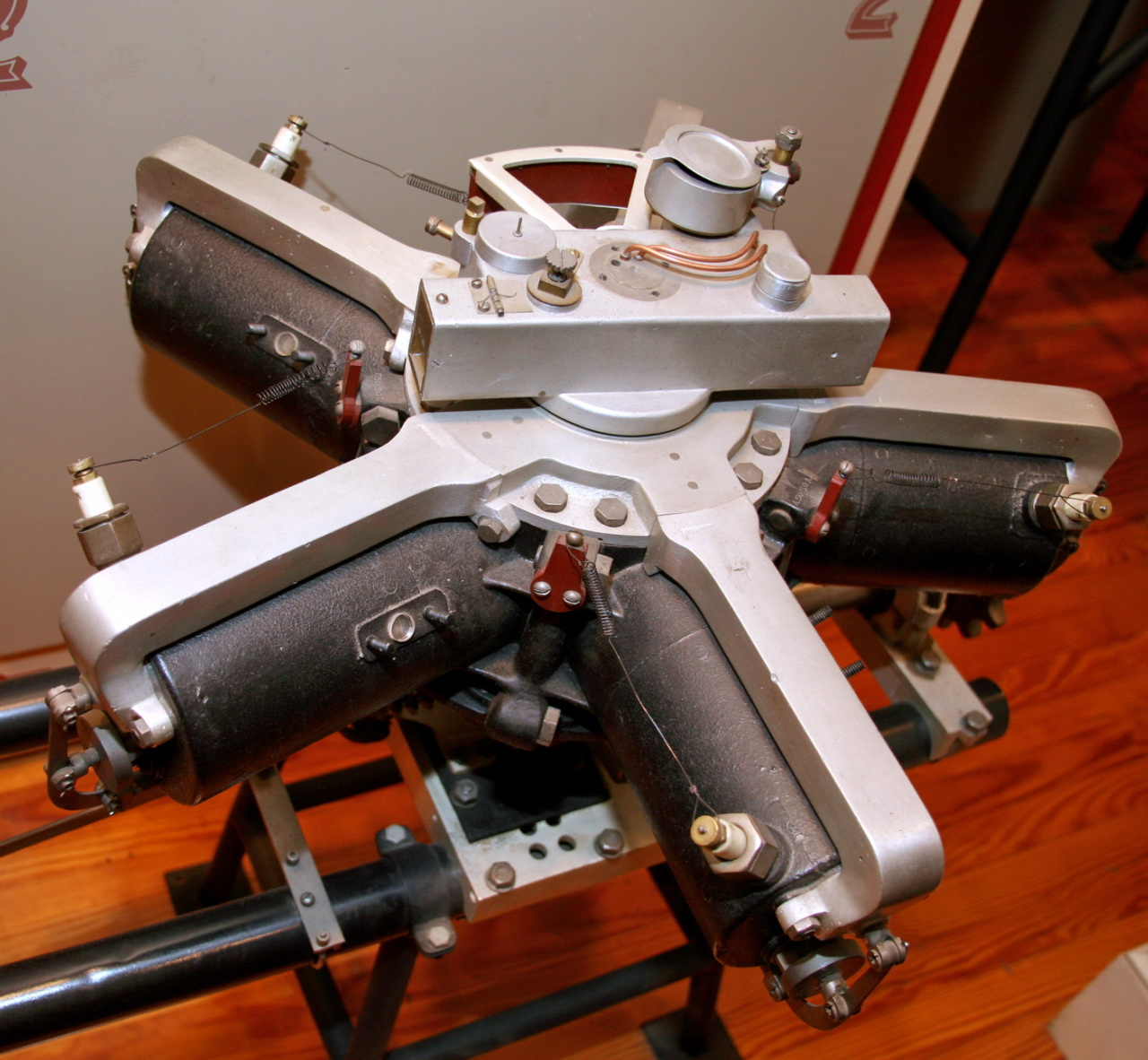
Adams-Farwell rotary engine

The Berliner Helicopter is a series of experimental helicopters built by Henry Berliner between 1922 and 1925. The helicopters had only limited controllability but were the most significant step forward in helicopter design in the US, until the production of the Vought-Sikorsky VS-300 helicopter in 1940. The 1922 flights of the Berliner and the de Bothezat H1 were the first by manned helicopters.

== Development ==
Emile Berliner, an inventor famous for his invention of the flat gramophone record, had experimented with intermeshing helicopters as early as 1907. The initial design was underpowered, and called for a lighter engine. Berliner developed a 36 hp five cylinder rotary engine with the Adams-Farwell Company from Dubuque, Iowa, producing the first rotary engine used for aircraft. Berliner later spun off the Gyro Motor Company from this work. A test rig was flown in 1908, followed by two other upgrades before Berliner focused on his other businesses.

In 1919, Emile Berliner's son, Henry Berliner, left the Army Air Service as an aerial photographer to work with his father on helicopter designs.

By 1922, Henry Berliner founded the Berliner Aircraft Company, with a focus on conventional aircraft. The Berliner Helicopter was successfully demonstrated throughout the 1920s, but interest was lost due to its limited controllability and engine-out abilities compared to the autogyro and conventional aircraft.

== Design ==
Emile Berliner named all his counter-rotating helicopters "gyrocopters" (gyrocopter was later used to describe a rotary-winged vehicle that operated on different principles). The first test rig was powered by two 30 hp Adams-Farwell rotary engines. The second example capable of lifting a person was powered by a single 60 hp engine. Emile initially intended his helicopter to have floats and to be used at low levels over water in case of an engine failure that would cause a forced landing. A Popular Mechanics article of the time supposed that his invention would be used as a "flying torpedo" more capable than an aeroplane at holding rich cities for ransom.

In 1918, Henry and Emile patented a single-rotor helicopter design that was not built. Henry Berliner's first effort was updating a new unmanned coaxial test rig. He followed on with a 570 lb, 80 hp Le Rhône engine powered, test rig that required assistants for stabilization. The rig could lift 900 lb. His test rig, with two wheels and handlebars, resembled a wheelbarrow with an engine mounted in it, with a tall vertical shaft driving two counter-rotating propellers.

In 1922, Henry Berliner developed a helicopter based on a surplus Nieuport 23 fuselage with a 220 hp radial engine driving two wing mounted counter-rotating rotors. The rotorshafts could tilt slightly forward and backward relative to each other to control yaw. The pitch of the aircraft was controlled by a small tail-mounted propeller with a variable pitch mechanism. Roll control was from a small set of adjustable wing-mounted louvers in the rotor slipstream. High-speed forward flight was also stabilized by a conventional rudder and elevator control at the rear of the aircraft. In 1923, the Helicopter incorporated triplane wings to allow for gliding in case of an engine failure. The last example built in 1924 featured a biplane configuration with 20 ft (6.1 m) rotors and a 1,850 lb gross weight.

== Operational history ==
In 1908, a test rig designed by John Newton Williams with coaxial propellers reached heights of 3 feet. Berliner used the historic College Park Airport in Maryland for most of his flight testing. A 1922 model with a single wing was able to hover at about 10 feet. The 1923 model was demonstrated at speeds up to 40 mph with poor roll control. On February 23, 1924 a test flight reached 15 feet (4.6 m) in altitude and 40 mph in forward speed. The next day, it was demonstrated in front of Navy officials and the press. That same year, testing of the Berliner Helicopter was moved to McCook Field, in Dayton, Ohio. McCook Field was the U.S. Army Signal Corps.' experimental test and development field. There it was flown by Air Service test pilot Harold R. Harris among others, achieving stable hovers of up to 15 feet. A helicopter hangar was constructed at the field for the craft, and is believed to be the world's first dedicated helicopter hangar.

== Surviving aircraft ==
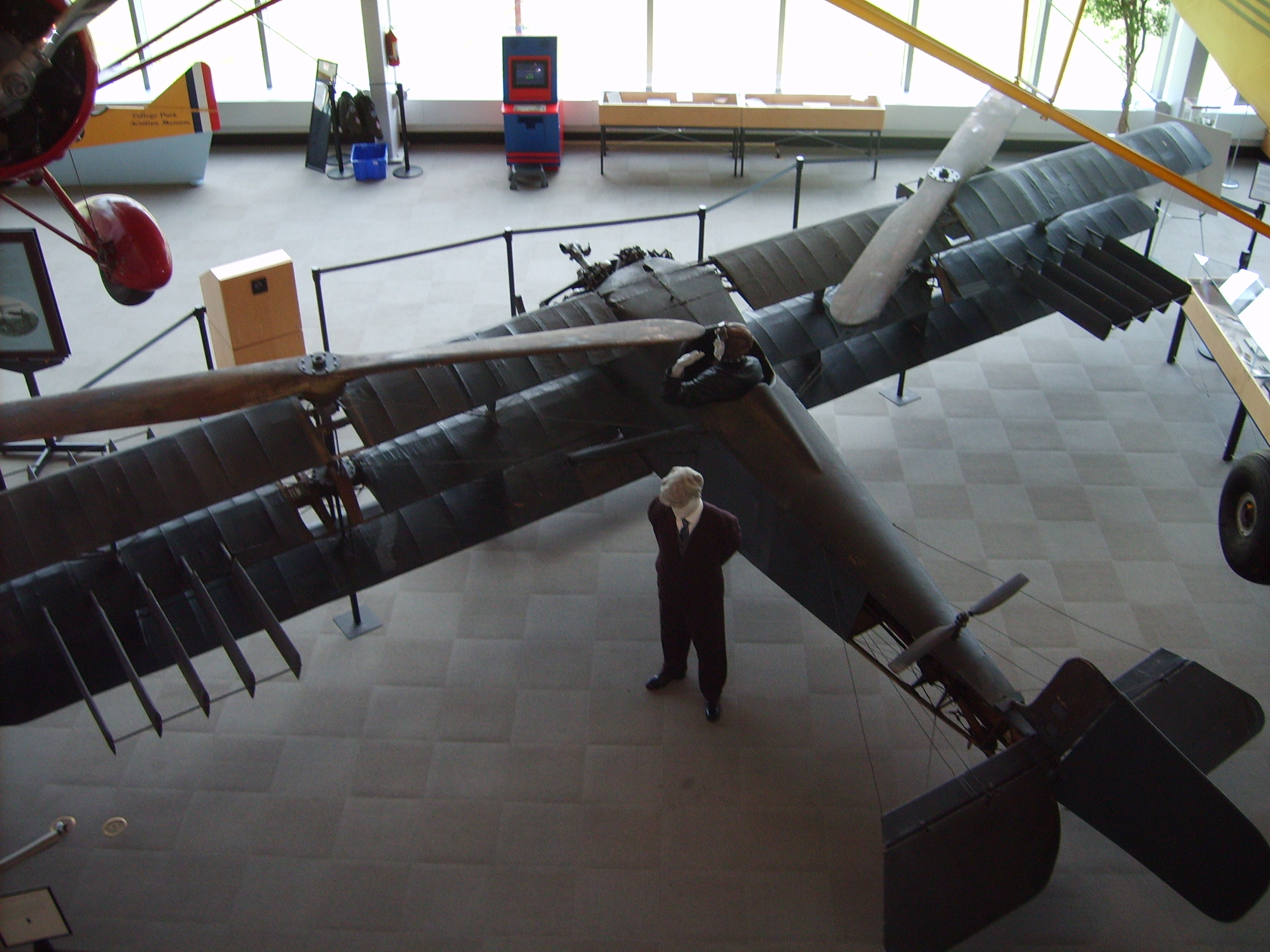
1924 Berliner Helicopter on display

- Berliner Helicopter No.5 is owned by the Smithsonian Air and Space Museum. It is on display at the College Park Aviation Museum in Maryland. This is the same aircraft test flown by the U.S. Army Signal Corp. at McCook Field in the 1920s.

== Variants ==
- Test Rig – First flown July 11, 1908 able to lift twice its weight.
- Aeromobile – A single 36-square-foot (3.3 m^{2}) propeller helicopter powered by a 55 hp engine without anti-torque mechanisms. It was capable of lifting 360 lb.
- 1909 Coaxial configuration designed by Berliner and J. Newton Williams.
- 1919 Unmanned coaxial test rig.
- 1919 Manned coaxial test rig.
- 1922 Berliner Helicopter built around a Nieuport 23 fuselage.
- 1923 Berliner Helicopter No. 5 "Helicoplane" – triplane wings added.
- 1924 Berliner Helicopter biplane with high aspect ratio wings.

== Specifications (Berliner Helicopter No.5) ==
Data from Smithsonian

General characteristics

- Crew: 1 (pilot)
- Length: 18 ft (5.5 m)
- Wingspan: 38 ft (12 m)
- Height: 6 ft 9 in (2.06 m)
- Empty weight: 1,650 lb (748 kg)
- Gross weight: 1,918 lb (870 kg)
- Powerplant: 1 × Bentley BR2 Rotary , 220 hp (160 kW)
- Main rotor diameter: 2 × 15 ft (4.6 m)

Performance

- Maximum speed: 35 kn (40 mph, 64 km/h)

== See also ==
Aircraft of comparable role, configuration, and era

- de Bothezat helicopter
- Pescara Model 3 Helicopter
