= ERCO Ercoupe =

American light aircraft

Ercoupe
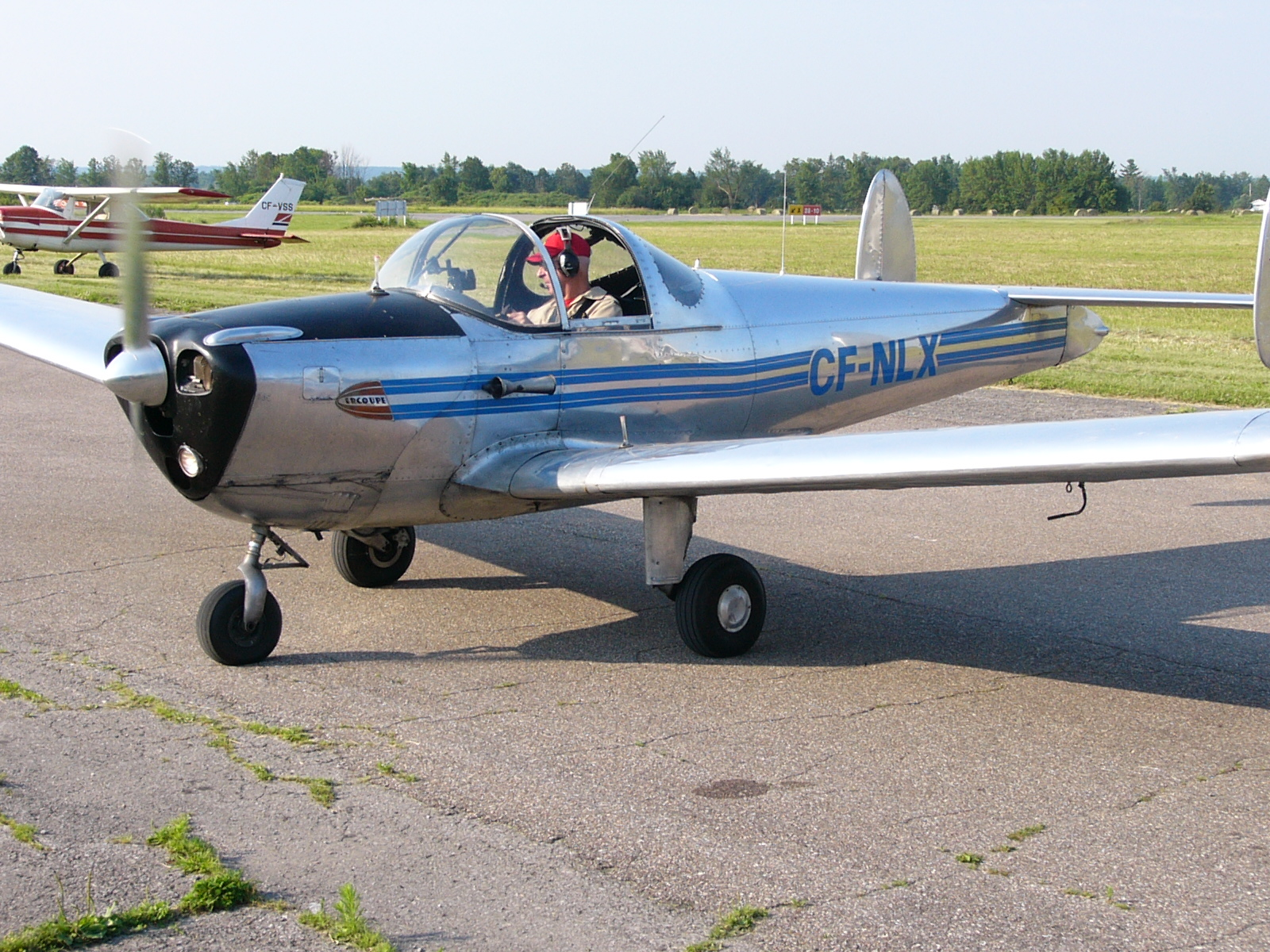
- 1956 model Forney F-1

General information
- Type: Light aircraft
- National origin: United States
- Manufacturer: Engineering and Research Corporation
- Designer: Fred Weick
- Number built: 5,685

History
- Manufactured: 1940–1969
- First flight: 1937
- Variants: Bryan Autoplane; Mooney M10 Cadet

The ERCO Ercoupe is an American low-wing monoplane aircraft that was first flown in 1937. It was originally manufactured by the Engineering and Research Corporation (ERCO) shortly before World War II; several other manufacturers continued its production after the war. The final model, the Mooney M-10, first flew in 1968 and the last model year was 1970. It was designed to be the safest fixed-wing aircraft that aerospace engineering could provide at the time, and the type continues to enjoy a faithful following.

== Design and development ==
=== Fred Weick ===
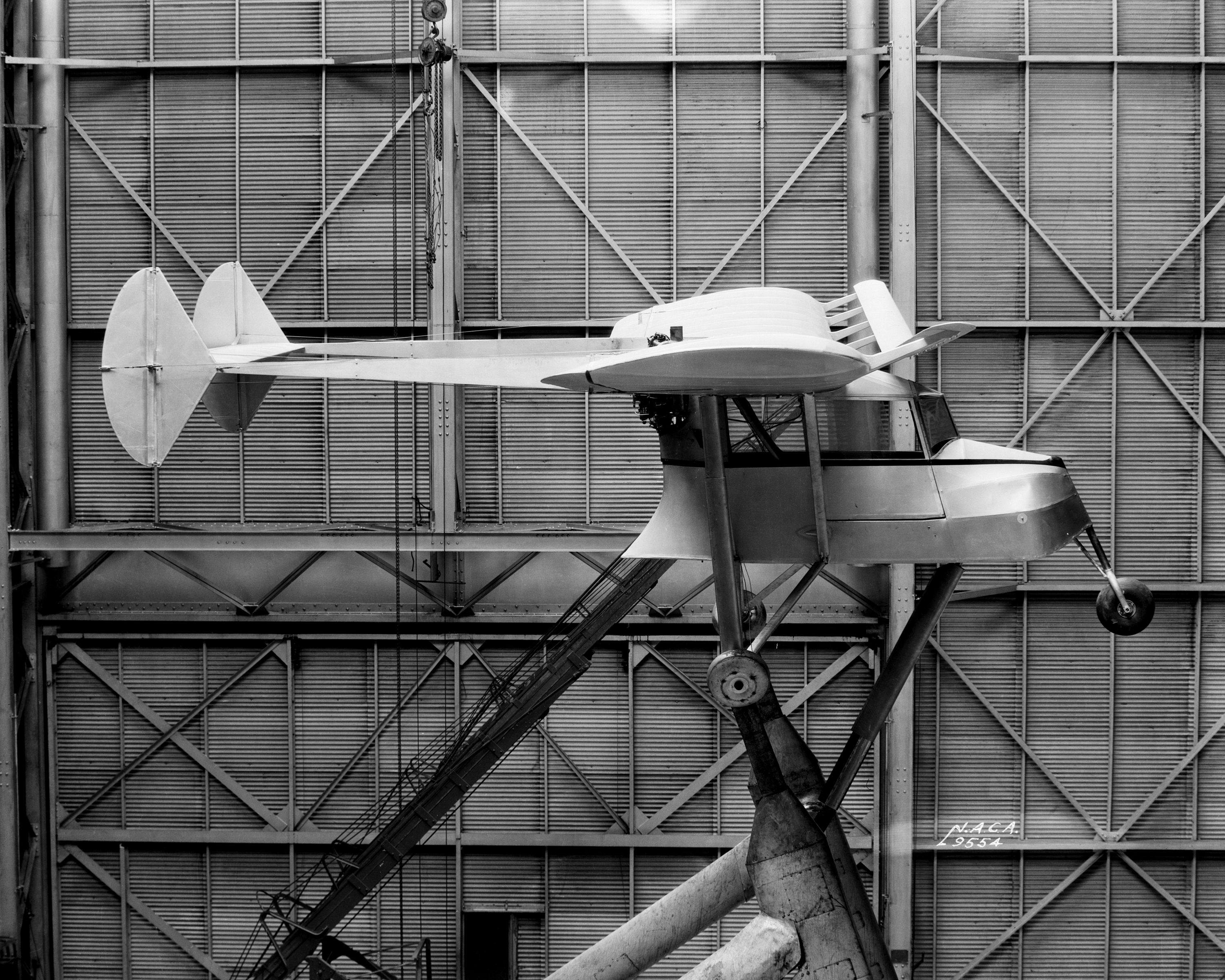
Fred Weick designed the W-1 with tricycle landing gear. It is shown in March 1934 in NACA's full scale wind tunnel.

In 1931, aeronautical engineer Fred Weick was assistant chief of the aeronautics division of the National Advisory Committee for Aeronautics (NACA). In 1934, he asked permission to build an aircraft based on the 1931 Stout Skycar using fabric instead of aluminum covering and control modifications based on NACA research. Weick and a group of co-workers designed and assembled the experimental aircraft in their spare time and paid for it themselves. The resulting aircraft, known as the W-1, featured tricycle landing gear, a parasol wing, and a pusher propeller configuration.

Fred Weick listed the W-1 design goals that were tested in later seminars:

- Tricycle landing gear with castering nosewheel, steerable if desired
- Suitable longitudinal and lateral stability with limited up-elevator deflection, to prevent loss of control due to stalling and spinning.
- A glide-control flap
- Two-control operation using controls for pitch and roll.

In 1934, the Bureau of Air Commerce approached Weick's team looking for standards for a competition for a safe and practical $700 aircraft. In 1936, the winner of the competition was the Stearman-Hammond Y-1, incorporating many of the safety features of the W-1. Two other winners were the Waterman Aeroplane and a roadable autogyro, the Autogiro Company of America AC-35. The W-1 was not intended for production to qualify as a competitor but was purchased by the Bureau for continued experimental tests in spin-control safety. After the prototype W-1 underwent a forced landing, an updated W-1A was built by Fairchild, incorporating leading edge cuffs.

=== ERCO ===
Weick left NACA in 1936 and joined Engineering and Research Corporation's (ERCO) fledgling aircraft team as chief designer, primarily to continue improving his aircraft design. Focusing his efforts on a number of design issues, primarily simplicity and safety, Weick strove to create a reasonably priced aircraft that would not stall or spin. Retaining the tricycle gear for ease of maneuvering on the ground, and limited stall-spin features, Weick switched to a low-wing monoplane configuration in his new model, powered by an engine in tractor configuration.

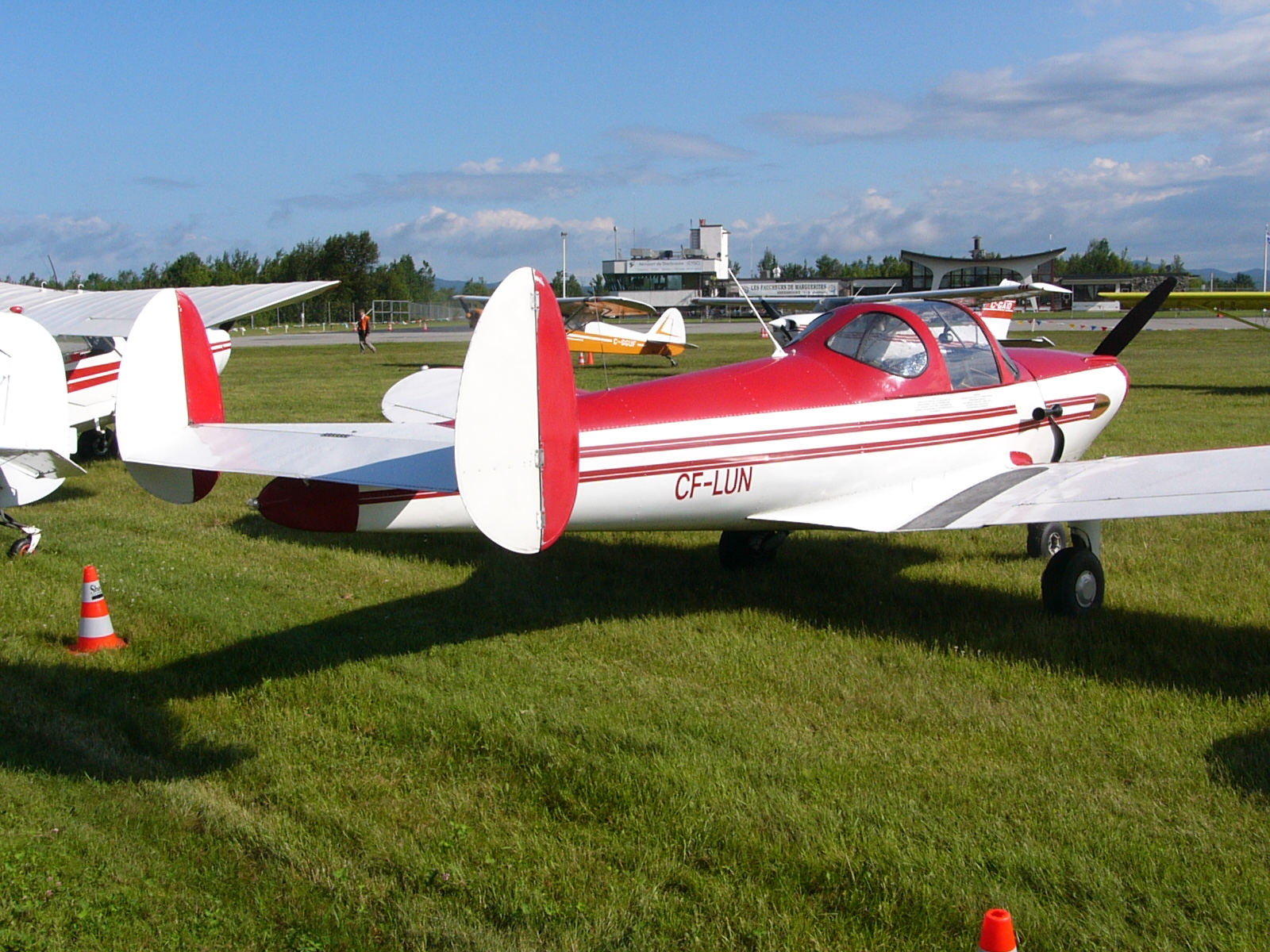
An Erco 415 Ercoupe showing its twin vertical stabilizer configuration.

The ERCO 310, which included a fully cowled engine, made its first flight in October 1937 at the College Park Airport and was soon renamed the "Ercoupe". The easy-to-fly design featured unique design features, including a large glazed canopy - with almost as much visibility as a bubble canopy - for improved visibility. The prototype 310 featured an ERCO-made inverted four-cylinder engine, the ERCO I-L 116, which was quickly dropped due to its high manufacturing cost compared to the new four-cylinder Continental A-65 air-cooled boxer engine. Lacking rudder pedals, the Ercoupe was flown using only the control wheel. A two-control system linked the rudder and aileron systems, which controlled yaw and roll, with the steerable nosewheel. The control wheel controlled the pitch and the steering of the aircraft, both on the ground and in the air, simplifying control and coordinated turning and eliminating the need for rudder pedals. A completely new category of pilot's license was created by the CAA for Ercoupe pilots who had never used a rudder pedal.

The Ercoupe was the first aircraft certified by the Civil Aeronautics Administration (CAA) as "characteristically incapable of spinning." The high-winged General Skyfarer obtained the second certification by licensing the ERCO technology. The first production Ercoupe, serial no. 1, NC15692 built in 1939 was donated to the National Air and Space Museum. In 1941 that aircraft, designated YO-55, was used in US Army Air Force testing.

The two-seat ERCO Ercoupe 415 went on sale in 1940. LIFE magazine described the aircraft as "nearly foolproof" and showed pictures of a pilot landing with his hands in the air. Only 112 aircraft were delivered before World War II intervened, halting all civil aircraft production. By the middle of 1941, aluminum supplies were being diverted to war-related production, so ERCO decided to manufacture Ercoupes for military use by using wood as the principal building material. The substitution of wood resulted in a heavier but quieter aircraft, because the wood absorbed vibrations from the engine and airflow. Ercoupes were flown during the war by the Civilian Pilot Training Program for flight instruction, and the Civil Air Patrol used them to patrol for German submarines.

=== Postwar sales ===
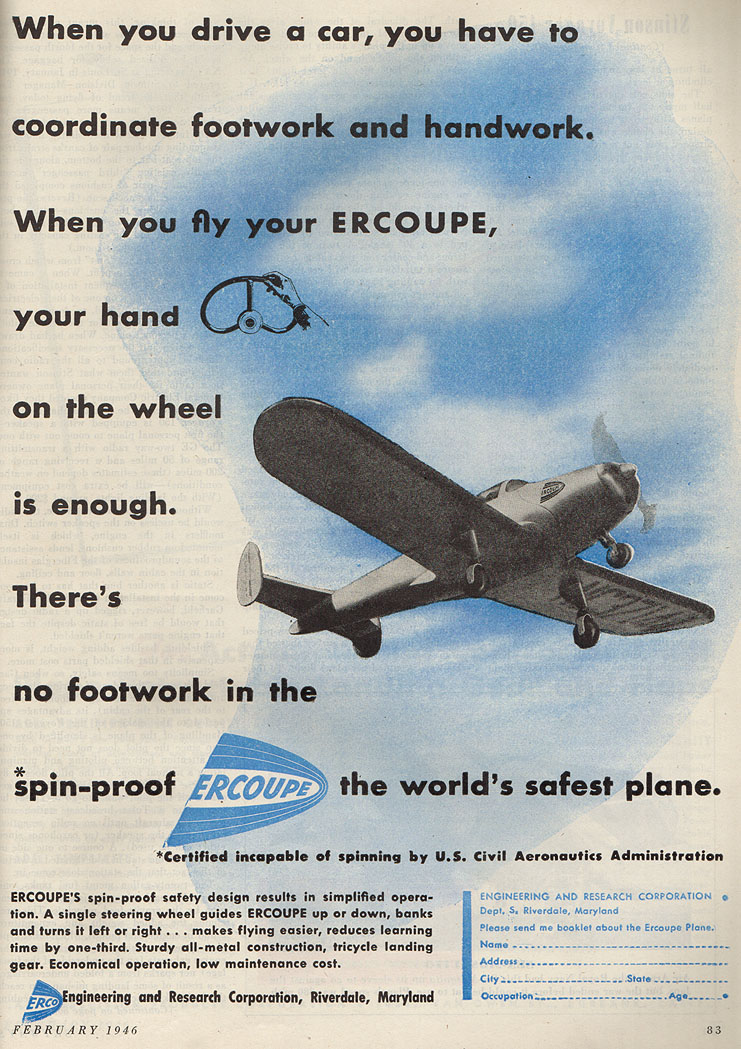
A full-page Ercoupe advertisement, February 1946

Although World War II had interrupted production of the Ercoupe, general aviation manufacturers were enthusiastic about the prospects of a postwar aviation boom. Thousands of men and women were trained as pilots by the government, and the hope was that they would want to include flying in their civilian life. Production of the model 415-C resumed in 1945, and in 1946 alone 4,311 aircraft were produced and sold at a cost of US$2,665. This was the same price as in 1941. At its peak, ERCO was turning out 34 Ercoupes per day on three daily production shifts. The aircraft was aggressively marketed through unconventional outlets such as the men's department of the Macy's department store chain.

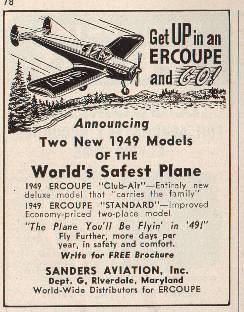
By April 1949, advertising was reduced to 1/9 page.

However, private aircraft sales slumped after the war and the bottom dropped out of the civil aircraft market in late 1946, ending prospects for a boom market for civil aircraft sales. A 30-day layoff at the ERCO factory in November resulted in rivets tossed around the factory and some aircraft sides and signs being painted. The year ended with an Ercoupe flown by a test pilot and mechanic breaking up in flight.

=== Other production ===
Aeronca

Aeronca obtained a licence to produce the Ercoupe 415 as the Aeronca 12AC Chum in 1946 and built two prototypes: NX39637, with the Ercoupe twin-tail, and NX83772 with a larger single tail, metal wings, and trailing-link struts in the main undercarriage. The Chum was powered by a Continental C-85J with a 108 mph (174 km/h) cruise speed. No production ensued.

Sanders Aviation

In 1947, ERCO sold its remaining Ercoupe inventory to Sanders Aviation, which continued to produce the aircraft in the same ERCO-owned factory. A total of 213 aircraft were sold by 1950. During this time, Wieck, ERCO's chief engineer, moved on to Texas A&M, where he developed the agricultural Piper Pawnee aircraft and eventually the popular Piper Cherokee with John Thorp and Karl Bergey.

Univair Aircraft Industries

Univair Aircraft Corporation of Aurora, Colorado purchased the Ercoupe design from the Engineering and Research Company in 1950. It provided spare parts and customer support to the existing aircraft.

Forney/Fornaire Aircoupe

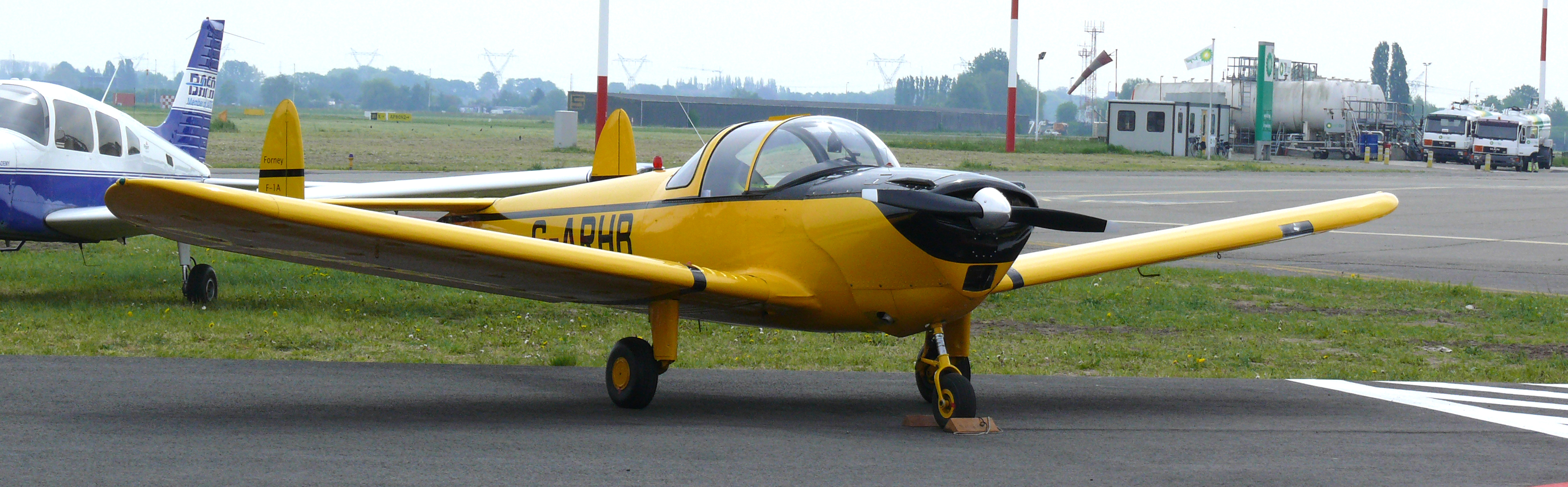
Forney F-1A Aircoupe

In April 1955, Univair sold the Ercoupe type certificate to the Forney Aircraft Company of Fort Collins, Colorado, which later became the Fornaire Aircraft Company. The aircraft produced differed from the 415-G in its engine/propeller combination; new aircraft were upgraded to a C-90 engine and had revised engine cowling, larger baggage compartment, and aluminum-covered wing panels. The F-1A model had three-axis controls and bucket seats. Production began in 1958 and ended in 1959.

- 56 of the F-1 Forney Deluxe were produced in 1958 and sold for $6,995 each.
- 59 of the F-1 Forney Explorer, Execta and Expediter were produced in 1959 and sold for $6,995.
- 23 of the F-1A Forney Trainer were produced in 1959. It was sold for $7,450.

A total of 138 aircraft were produced.

Air Products Company Aircoupe

Between August 1960 and March 1964, the rights to the Aircoupe aircraft were held by the AirCoupe division of Air Products Company of Carlsbad, New Mexico. The company was started by the city, with the hope of establishing aircraft manufacture as a local industry. AirCoupe purchased the type certificate from Forney when a potential deal with Beechcraft fell through. Only a few airframes were produced before the type certificate was sold to Alon, Incorporated on March 16, 1964. 25 of the F-1A Forney Trainer were produced for US$7,450 each.

Alon Aircoupe

Alon Inc. was founded by John Allen and Lee O. Higdon, two executives who had retired from aircraft manufacturer Beechcraft to found their own company. They had previously negotiated with Forney Aircraft to purchase production of the Aircoupe so that Beechcraft could use the design as an introductory trainer. The deal was canceled by Olive Ann Beech, who decided to concentrate resources on the Beechcraft Musketeer. This decision caused the executives to leave Beechcraft and establish Alon in McPherson, Kansas, which purchased the type certificate for the Aircoupe from the City of Carlsbad, New Mexico on March 16, 1964.

"A new company formed by former Beechcraft executives Allen and Higdon, who have purchased all assets, jigs, tools, and engineering of the program from the city of Carlsbad NM. They expect to deliver the first of 30-50 Aircoupes to be built next year for about $8,000."

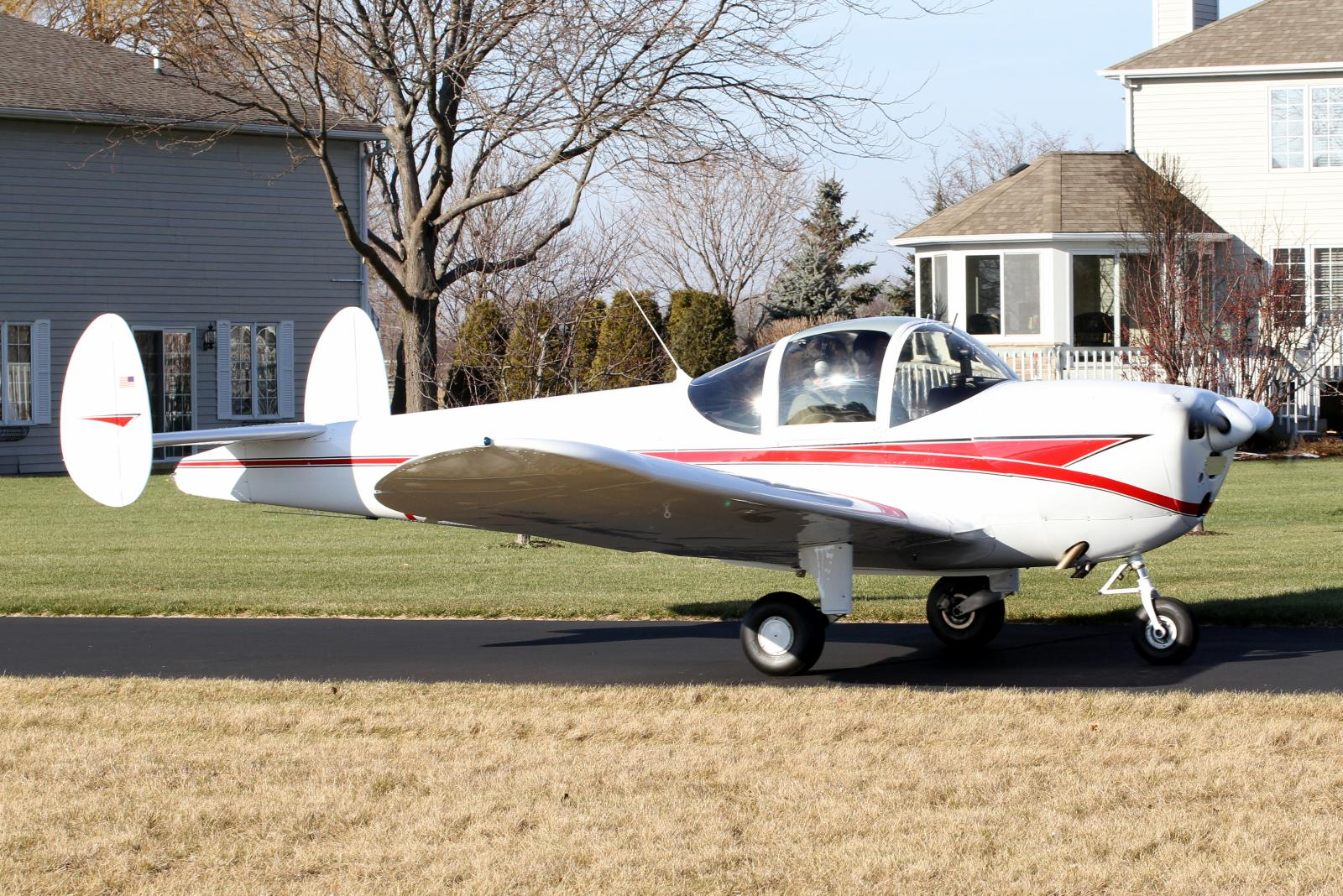
Alon A-2

The Alon A-2 and A-2A Aircoupes featured a sliding canopy, a Continental C90 90 hp (67 kW) engine, separate bucket seats, and an improved instrument panel. The A-2 also differed from earlier two-control models in having limited-movement rudder pedals. This was done in order to make it a more acceptable training aircraft and to make it easier to counteract increased P-factor yaw during a climb from the more powerful engine. Nosewheel steering was no longer interlinked with the control yoke, and was changed to the more common practice of being interlinked with the rudder pedals (this was the same system that was installed in the Forney F-1A). The older two axes control system was offered as an option. The single control (non-differential) wheel brakes remained. The airplane had a higher rate of climb, a higher speed for best climb rate, and better engine cooling. Its non-spinning characteristics remained unchanged.

Alon produced 245 A-2s from 1964 to 1967, with peak production of 137 in 1966. The last 25 A-2s produced by Alon had spring-steel landing gear in place of the original main gear struts, light alloy castings and trailing links. The base price in 1967 was up to $7975. Production of the A-2 ceased in September 1967, and on October 9, 1967, Alon was purchased by, and became a division of, the Mooney Airplane Company of Kerrville, Texas.

Mooney A-2A and M10 Cadet

Mooney began producing the aircraft in 1968 as the Mooney A-2A. Next, the company redesigned the fuselage from the cockpit back, with square windows behind the sliding canopy. Even as it produced the A-2A Cadet, Mooney was busy re-designing the aircraft. On February 23, 1968, the first Mooney M10 Cadet flew. The aircraft has a single fin, with a vertical leading edge, as most Mooneys do.

Univair

The type certificate was sold to Univair Aircraft Corporation of Aurora, Colorado in October 1974 and remains with Univair. The company has not produced any new aircraft but continues to produce replacement parts and provide technical assistance to Ercoupe owners.

== Operational history ==
=== Military ===
Three model 415-C aircraft were procured by the United States Army Air Forces for use during World War II.

Model 415-C military service
Construction number	Construction date	Civilian registration	Purchase date	Army Air Force designation	Army Air Force serial number	Service date
39	1941	NC28944	January 4, 1941	YO-55	41-18875	February 26, 1941
110	1941	NC37143	August 14, 1941	PQ-13	41-39099	August 1941
11	12/04/1940	NC28655	January 4, 1941	PQ-13	41-25196	August 1941

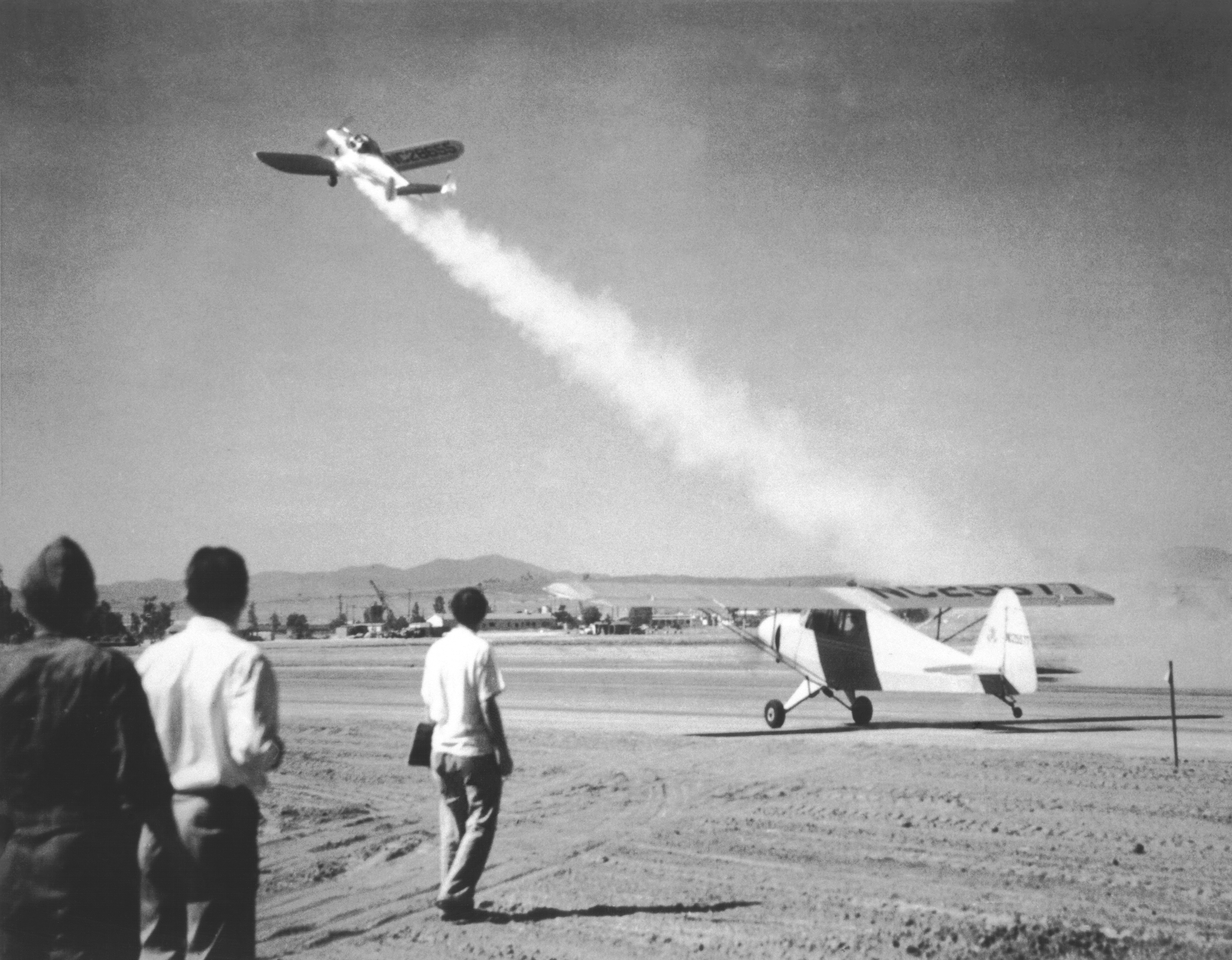
Takeoff of America's first "rocket-assisted" fixed-wing aircraft, an Ercoupe fitted with a GALCIT developed solid propellent JATO booster with a thrust of 28 pounds force (125 N). March Field, California.

On 12 August 1941, the first USAAF rocket-assist takeoff was made by a Wright Field test pilot, Capt. Homer Boushey, using a small civilian-type Ercoupe aircraft. Subsequent refinements of this technique were made for assisting heavily loaded aircraft in taking off from limited space.

An additional Ercoupe was evaluated by the Royal Air Force in 1947. This aircraft was serial number 4784, carried Royal Air Force markings VX 147, and was polished metal with RAF roundels.

=== Light sport use ===
The Ercoupe is a type certified aircraft. However, some Univair Ercoupe 415-C and 415-CD models meet the FAA requirements to be flown by sport pilots as light-sport aircraft. The characteristics of the Ercoupe helped Jessica Cox (who was born without arms) to become a qualified pilot.

== Variants ==
=== ERCO/Sanders ===
310
1937 prototype originally powered by a 37 hp (28 kW) Continental A40 engine and with tricycle landing gear, metal construction, fabric-covered wings, and a single tail fin. The engine was later swapped with a 65 hp (48 kW) ERCO IL-116.

415
Initial production aircraft powered by 65 hp (48 kW) ERCO IL-116 engines. The -A and -B suffixes were never used; the company's official records use only the -C suffix, which stood for "Continental", once the IL-116 was no longer used. 10 aircraft were built from 1939 to 1940.

Wooden Ercoupe
Two aircraft were built using birch and plywood in 1941 to demonstrate use of non-strategic materials, but no further aircraft were built and the test articles were scrapped.

415-C Ercoupe
First variant to enter large-scale production. Prewar 415-C Ercoupes were powered by 65 hp (48 kW) Continental A65-8 engines, while postwar Ercoupes were powered by 75 hp (56 kW) Continental C75-12 engines. Maximum gross weight was 1,260 lb (570 kg). 4,520 total built; 112 pre-war and 4,408 post-war.

415-D Ercoupe
As 415-C but with fuel capacity increased by 1 US gal (3.8 L) and a modified up-elevator limit. Gross weight was also increased to 1,400 lb (640 kg). 77 built. One 415-D was modified under a Supplemental Type Certificate to fit a 108 hp (81 kW) Lycoming O-235-C2C powerplant.

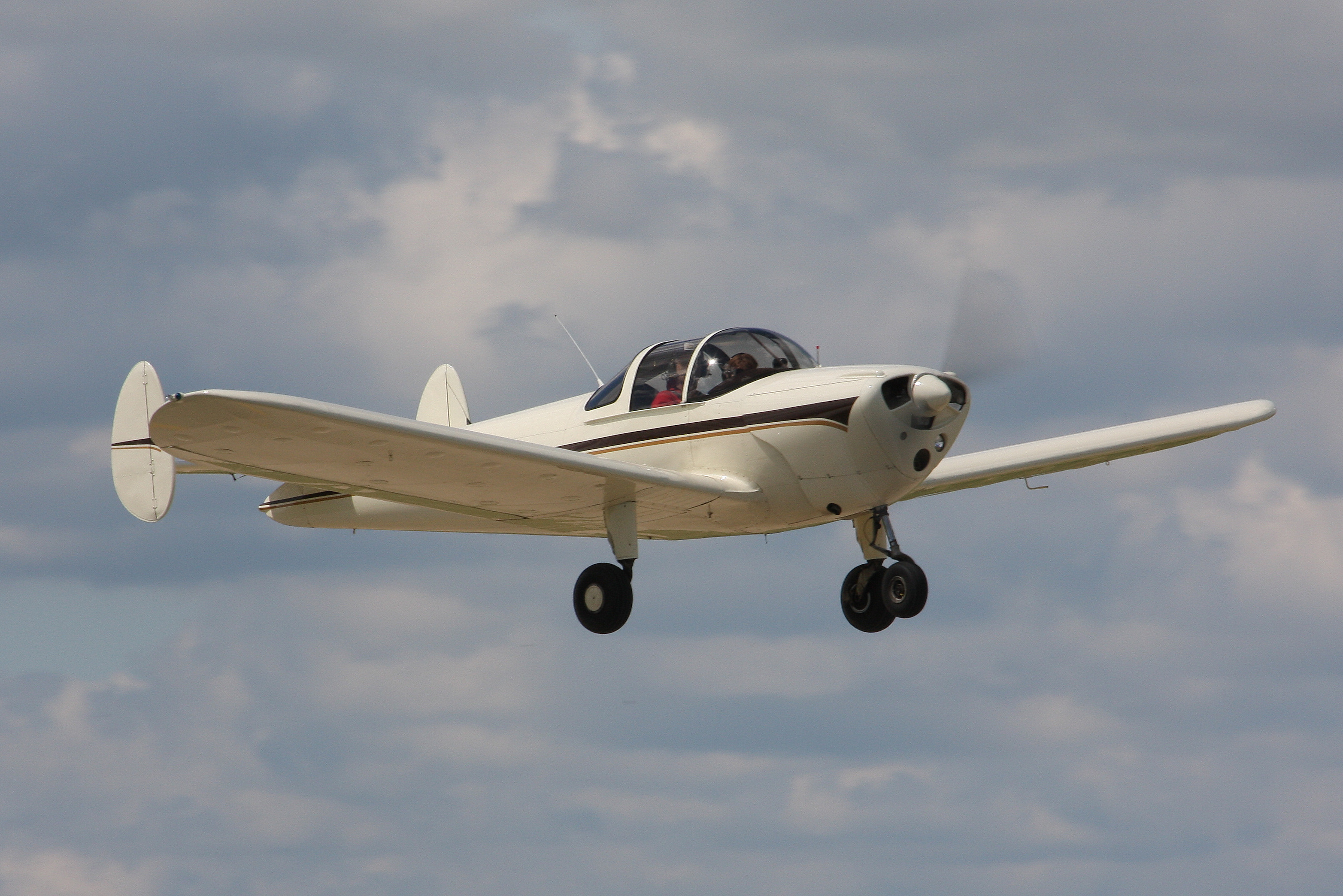
ERCO 415-CD Ercoupe

415-CD Ercoupe
As 415-D but with a revised elevator limit as well as a modified nose gear and ventilation system. Gross weight was reduced back to 1,260 lb (570 kg). 275 built.

415-E Ercoupe
As 415-D but powered by an 85 hp (63 kW) Continental C85-12 or C85-12F engine, introduced the split elevator with 20° of up-elevator travel. Gross weight was once again increased to 1,400 lb (640 kg). 139 built.

415-F Ercoupe
As 415-D but powered by a 90 hp (67 kW) Continental C90 engine.

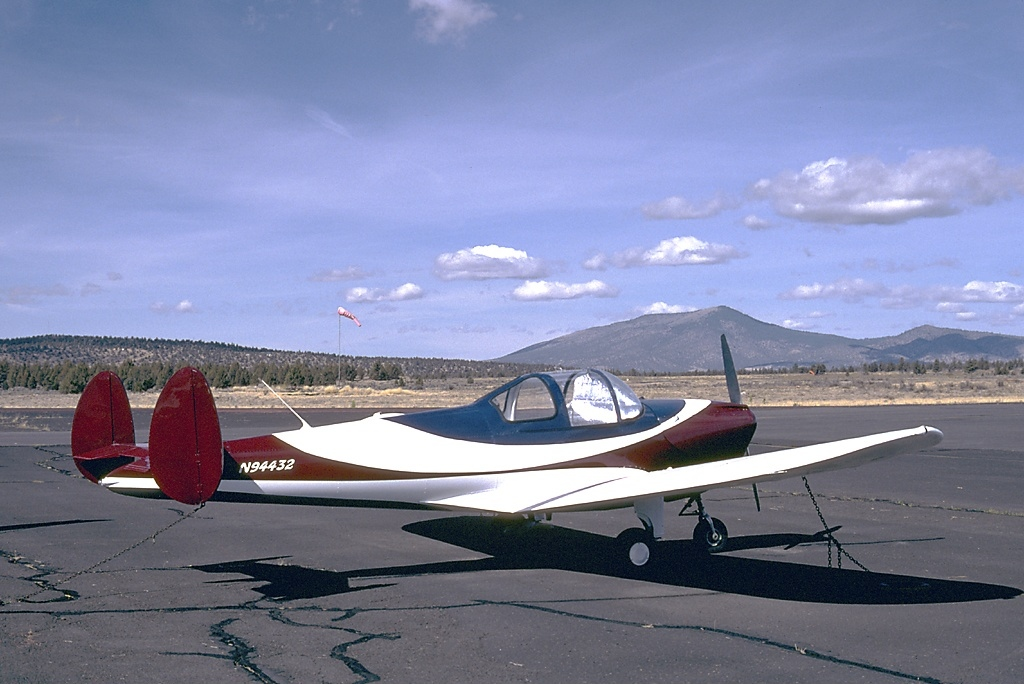
ERCO 415-G Club-Air

415-G Club-Air
As 415-E but with a rear Kiddy-Seat and a modified windscreen.

415-H Club-Air
As 415-G but powered by a 75 hp (56 kW) Continental C75 engines. A total of 70 415-G and 415-H aircraft were built.

YO-55
A single Ercoupe was acquired for evaluation for the military observation role.

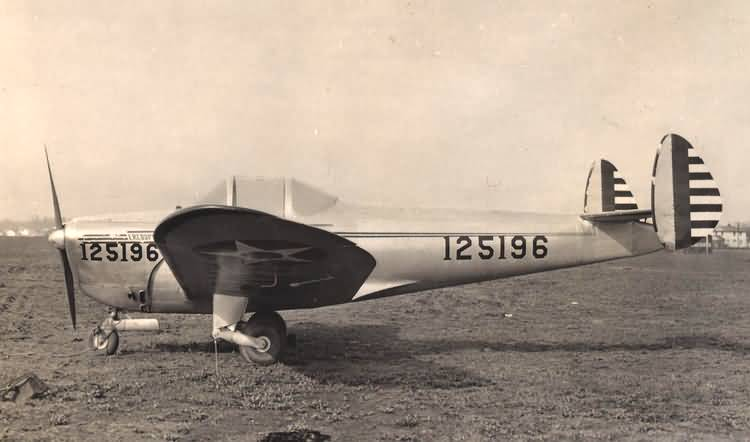
XPQ-13

XPQ-13
Target drone variant of the Ercoupe.

Twin Ercoupe
In 1948 J. B. Collie of Southeast Air Service produced a Twin Ercoupe by joining two Ercoupe fuselages with a new centre section, similar to the North American P-82 Twin Mustang, for use in airshows by Thrasher Brothers Air Circus, Elberton GA. Flown by Grady Thrasher and his brother, who rolled, looped, and spun it. The aircraft had a smoke system for each engine, and could be flown from either cockpit.

=== Forney/Air Products ===
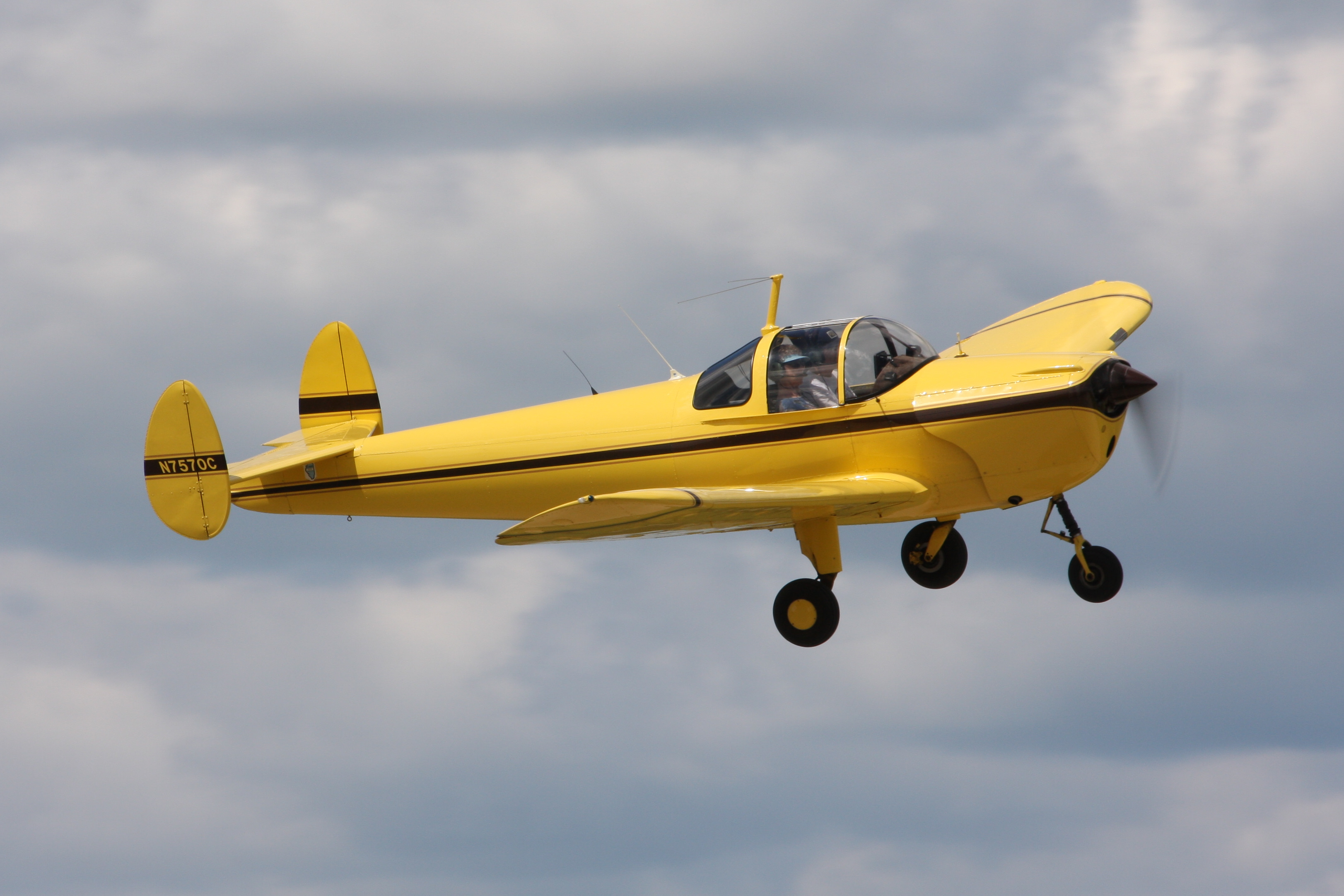
Forney F-1A Aircoupe

F-1 Aircoupe
Forney/Fornaire-built development of the ERCO 415-G. Powered by a 90 hp (67 kW) Continental C90-12F engine, the F-1 differed from the 415-G in that it had a metal-clad outer wing, an improved canopy, a redesigned canopy, as well as a new instrument panel and seats. 115 built.

F-1A Aircoupe
As F-1 but with modified control runs as well as a bew rear spar and nosewheel leg. 50 built by Air Products Co.

=== Alon ===
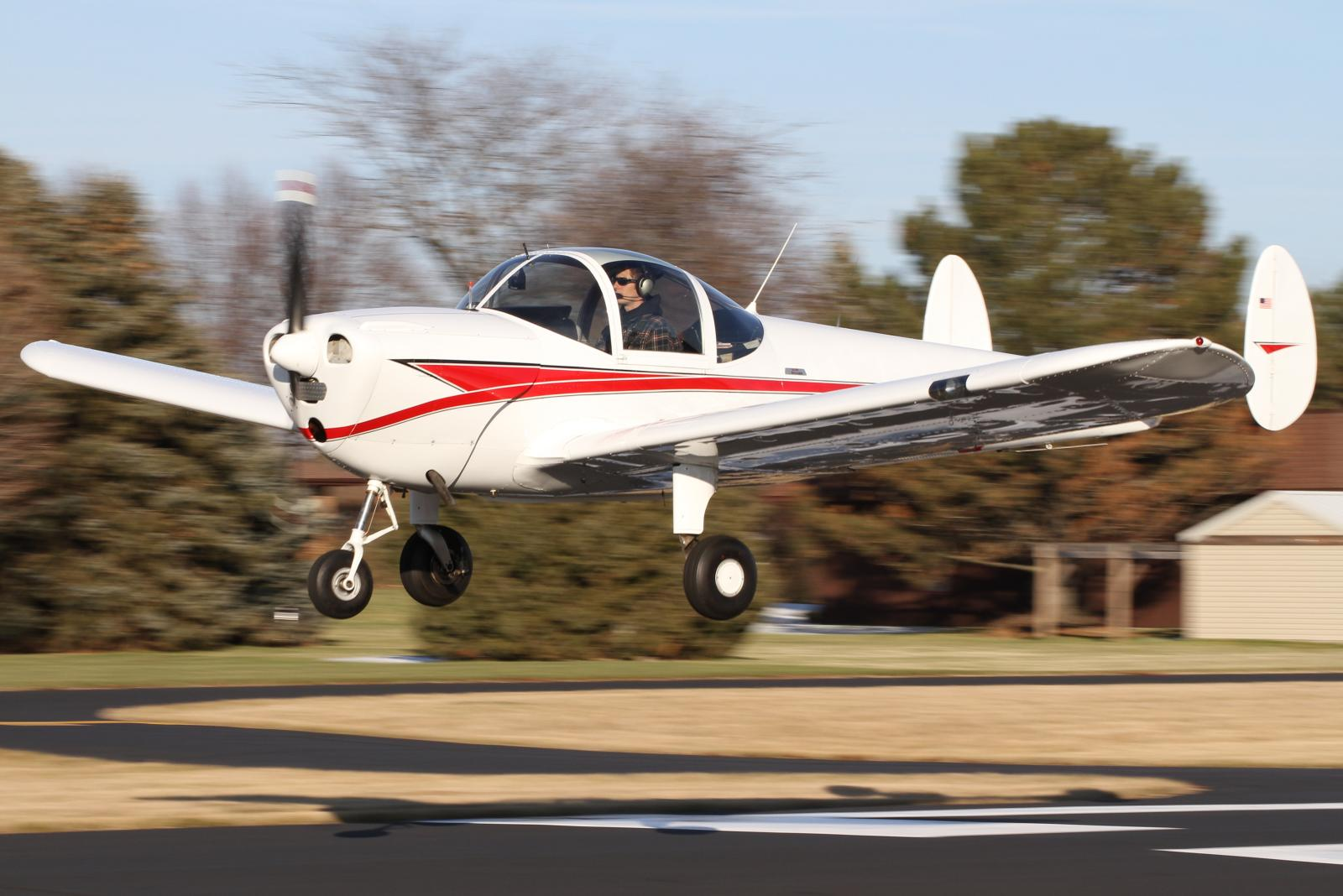
Alon A-2 Aircoupe

A-2 Aircoupe
Alon-built derivative of the F-1A powered by a 90 hp (67 kW) Continental C90-16F. Other differences included a sliding canopy as well as improved fuel tanks and instruments. 244 built.

A-2A Aircoupe
As A-2 but with spring steel main landing gear. 64 built.

A-3 Argus 130
As A-2A but powered by a 130 hp (97 kW) Franklin engine and with a "two-plus-two" cabin. One prototype built.

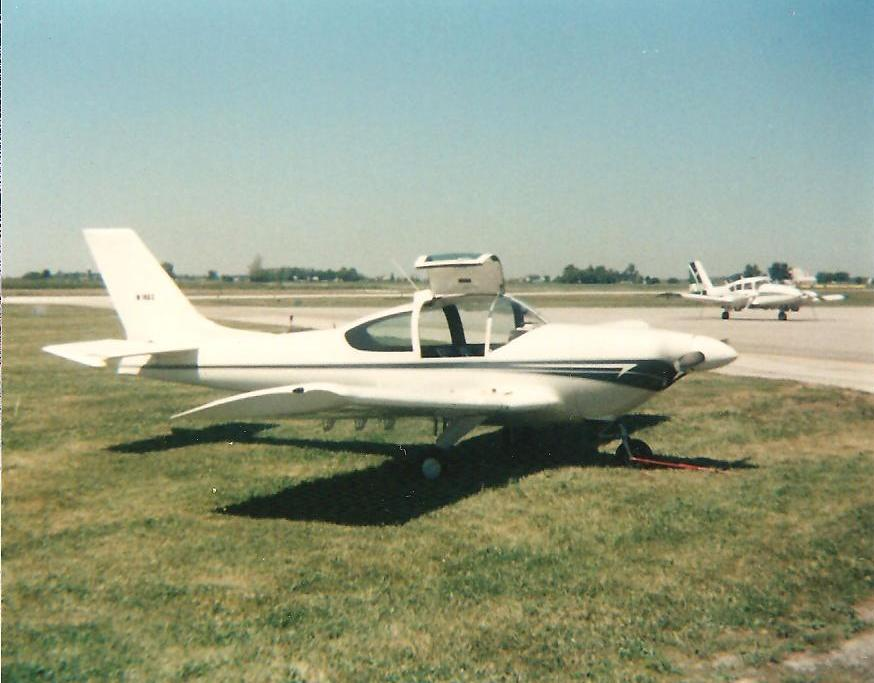
Alon XA-4

XA-4
Four-seat development of the A-2 powered by a 150 hp (112 kW) Lycoming O-320-A engine. The XA-4 also featured a stretched fuselage, a redesigned cowling, modified wings, and a single swept tail fin. One prototype built.

=== Derivatives ===
Mooney M10 Cadet
A single-tailed version of the Alon Aircoupe, powered by a 90 hp (67 kW) Continental C90-16F, aka Mooney-Coupe, with 59 aircraft built.

Bryan Autoplane
Leland D. Bryan built a series of roadable aircraft using an Ercoupe fuselage, calling this line the Bryan Autoplane. Significant modifications included a double-articulated folding wing mechanism and a pusher engine. It still retained Ercoupe features, such as the twin tail and the center section. The first flight was in 1953, and the model II flew 65 hours. The Model III with a single wing-fold mechanism crashed in 1974, killing Bryan.

Lasher Little Thumper
C. W. Lasher built and flew a single-seat open-cockpit taildragger aircraft called "Little Thumper", using an Ercoupe center section and wing assembly and an Aeronca Champ aft fuselage.

== Specifications (Ercoupe 415-C) ==
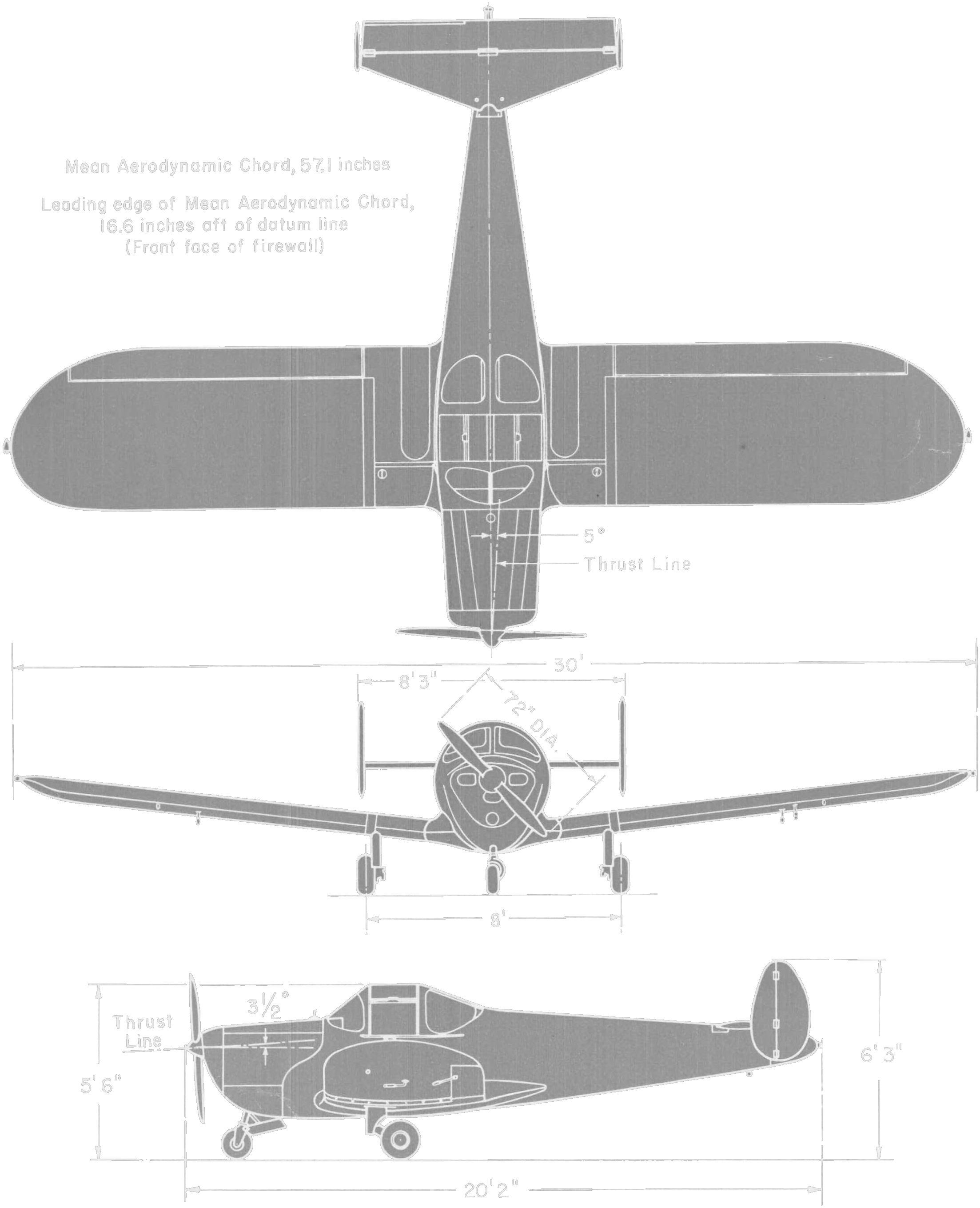
3-view silhouette drawing of the ERCO 415-C Ercoupe

Data from EAA Museum, Federal Aviation Administration, Plane & Pilot

General characteristics

- Crew: one
- Capacity: one passenger
- Length: 20 ft 9 in (6.32 m)
- Wingspan: 30 ft 0 in (9.14 m)
- Height: 5 ft 11 in (1.80 m)
- Wing area: 142.6 sq ft (13.25 m^{2})
- Airfoil: NACA 43013
- Powerplant: 1 × Continental C75-12 4-cylinder air-cooled horizontally-opposed piston engine, 75 hp (56 kW)
- Propellers: 2-bladed variable-pitch propeller

Performance

- Maximum speed: 110 mph (180 km/h, 96 kn)
- Cruise speed: 95 mph (153 km/h, 83 kn)
- Stall speed: 48 mph (77 km/h, 42 kn)
- Never exceed speed: 144 mph (232 km/h, 125 kn)
- Range: 300 mi (480 km, 260 nmi)
- Service ceiling: 13,000 ft (4,000 m)
- Rate of climb: 550 ft/min (2.8 m/s)
- Wing loading: 8.83 lb/sq ft (43.1 kg/m^{2})
- Power/mass: 0.13 hp/lb (0.21 kW/kg)

== See also ==
- Jessica Cox – Ercoupe pilot born without arms

Aircraft of comparable role, configuration, and era

- Fleet 80 Canuck
- General Skyfarer
- Luscombe 8
- Max Holste MH.52
- Piper J-3 Cub
- Taylorcraft B
