= Albanese =

Albanese is an Italian surname. It means "Albanian", in reference to the Arbëreshë people (Italo-Albanians) of southern Italy or someone of Albanian origin. The surname is common in southern Italy but more rare elsewhere in the country. Notable people with the surname include:

- Albano Albanese (1921–2010), Italian hurdler and high jumper
- Alessandro Albanese (born 2000), Belgian professional footballer
- Antonio Albanese (1937–2013), Italian fencer
- Anthony Albanese (born 1963), Australian politician and current prime minister of Australia
- Antonio Albanese (born 1964), Italian comedian, actor, director, and writer
- Catherine L. Albanese (born 1940), American religious studies scholar, professor, lecturer, and author
- Charles Albanese (1937–1995), American serial killer
- Diego Albanese (born 1973), Argentine rugby union player
- Donald J. Albanese (born 1937), American politician
- Enrico Albanese (1834–1889), Italian surgeon, a member of the Expedition of the Thousand and close friend of Garibaldi
- Francesco Albanese (1912–2005), Italian tenor
- Francesca Albanese (born 1977), Italian international lawyer, academic and current UN Special Rapporteur on the occupied Palestinian territories
- Frank Albanese (1931–2015), American actor
- Giacomo Albanese (1890–1947), Italian mathematician
  - Albanese variety, construction of algebraic geometry, named for Giacomo Albanese
- Giuseppe Albanese (born 1979), Italian pianist
- Joe Albanese (1933–2000), American professional baseball player
- Laura Albanese (born 1957), Canadian news anchor and politician
- Lauren Albanese (born 1989), American professional tennis player
- Lewis Albanese (1946–1966), US soldier posthumously awarded the Medal of Honor
- Licia Albanese (1909–2014), Italian soprano
- Pellegrino Albanese (born 1991), Italian footballer
- Roberto Albanese (1950–2016), Italian politician and environmentalist
- Rory Albanese (born 1977), American executive producer and writer for The Daily Show with Jon Stewart
- Sal Albanese (born 1949), American politician
- Silvano Albanese better known by his stage name Coez (born 1983), Italian singer, rapper
- Thomas Albanese (born 1988), Italian footballer
- Tina Albanese, American television producer and television writer
- Tom Albanese (born 1957), American businessman and former chief executive officer of Rio Tinto
- Valentina Albanese (born 1974), Italian racing driver
- Vannie Albanese (1912–1984), American football player
- Vincenzo Albanese (born 1996), Italian cyclist
- Vito Albanese (1918–1998), American union leader and politician

== See also ==
- Albanesi
- Names of the Albanians and Albania
- Albanese Candy
