= Cusmano =

Cusmano is an Italian surname. Notable people with the surname include:

- Giacomo Cusmano (1834–1888), Italian Roman Catholic priest
- Vincenzina Cusmano (1826–1894), Italian Roman Catholic nun

== See also ==
- Cusumano, surname
