= Deutsche Grammophon =

German classical music record label

Coordinates: 52.49785°N 13.4619°E

Deutsche Grammophon GmbH, Berlin
- Parent company: Universal Music Group (UMG) (1998–); Previously: Siemens & Halske (1941–1962); PolyGram (Grammophon-Philips Group) (1962–1998)
- Founded: 1898
- Founder: Emile Berliner
- Distributors: Decca Records; Verve Records (US)
- Genre: Classical music Contemporary Classical Music
- Country of origin: Germany
- Location: Stralauer Allee 1; 10245 Berlin, Germany
- Official website: https://www.deutschegrammophon.com/en

Deutsche Grammophon (German: [ˈdɔʏtʃə ɡʁamoˈfoːn]; DGG) is a German classical music record label that was the precursor of the corporation PolyGram. Headquartered in Berlin Friedrichshain, it is now part of Universal Music Group (UMG) since its merger with the MCA family of labels in 1999. Deutsche Grammophon is the world's oldest surviving established record company. Presidents of the company are Frank Briegmann, Chairman and CEO Central Europe of Universal Music Group and Clemens Trautmann.

== History ==
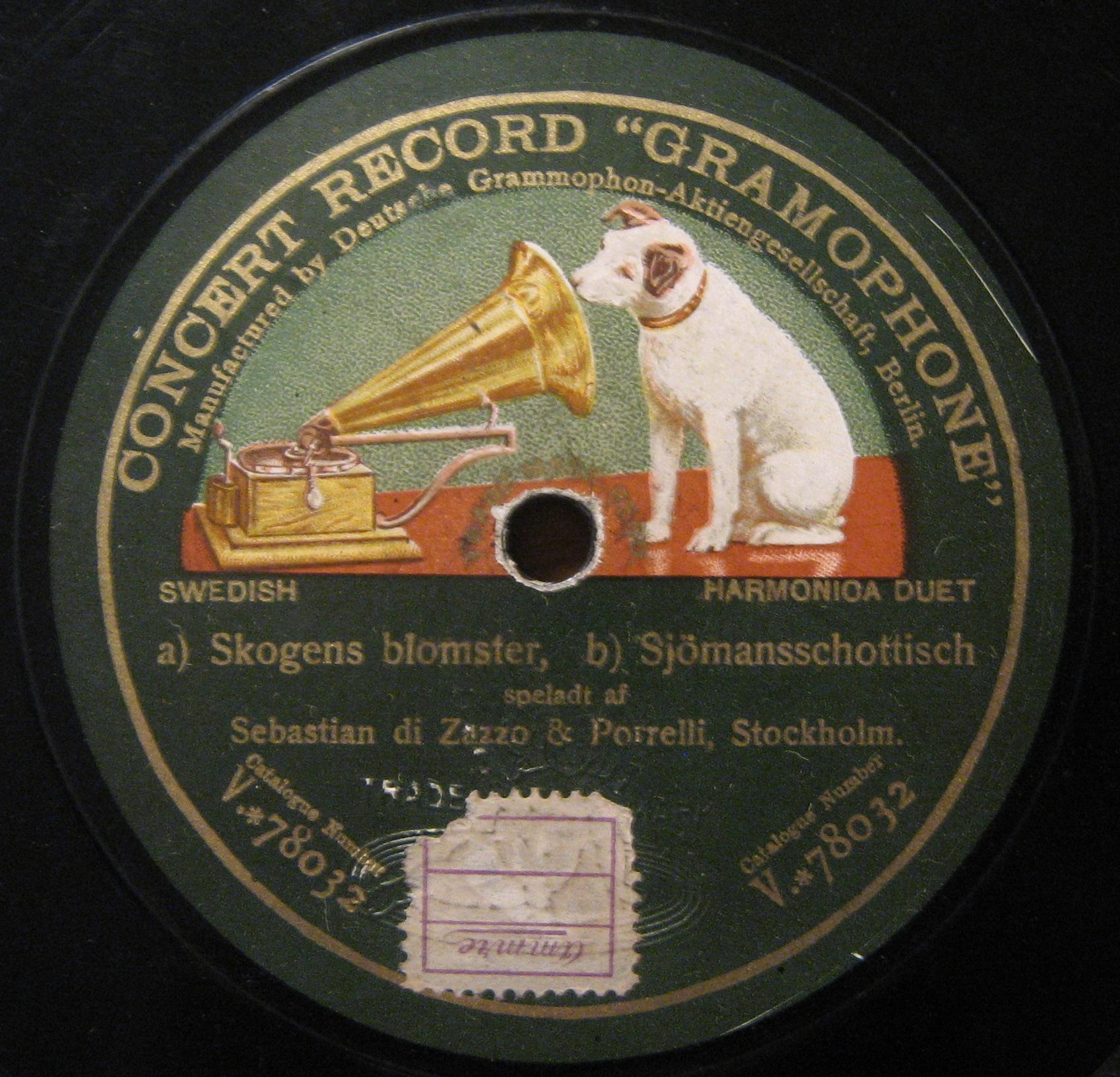
Record of Emile Berliner's Deutsche Grammophon Gesellschaft

Deutsche Grammophon Gesellschaft was founded in 1898 by German-born United States citizen Emile Berliner as the German branch of his Berliner Gramophone Company. Berliner sent his nephew Joseph Sanders from America to set up operations. Based in the city of Hanover (the founder's birthplace), the company became a fully owned subsidiary of the Gramophone Company Ltd. in 1900 and an affiliate of the US Victor Talking Machine Company. After the outbreak of World War I in 1914, the company seceded from the Gramophone Company. Though no longer affiliated with Gramophone Company and Victor, Deutsche Grammophon retained the "His Master's Voice" trademark featuring Nipper the dog for use in Germany until the late 1940s; for several years following its secession, the company even continued selling recordings made from pre-war matrices owned by the Gramophone Company and Victor.

In 1941, Deutsche Grammophon was purchased by Siemens & Halske. In 1949, Deutsche Grammophon sold the German rights of the His Master's Voice trademark to the Electrola unit of EMI. The dog and gramophone were replaced by the crown of tulips, designed by Siemens advertising consultant Hans Domizlaff. The distinctive yellow cartouche banner, occupying almost a third of each recording's cover, first appeared in 1957 and was a staple of the majority of its full-price recordings until the early years of the 21st century, when it all but disappeared from new releases. It has since enjoyed something of a revival in newer recordings.

In 1962, Siemens formed a joint venture with Netherlands-based Philips to create the DGG/PPI Record Group, which became PolyGram Records in 1972. By this time, DGG had built a reputation for high-quality recording in the classical field as well as a notable roster of contracted singers, musicians, and conductors. Through its subsidiary label Archiv Produktion it also stimulated interest in Western medieval and renaissance music, 15th – 16th century choral polyphony, Gregorian chant, and pioneering use of "historical instruments" and performance practices in recordings.

DGG/Polydor's entrance into the US market in 1969 (DGG had previous been distributed in the US by Decca and MGM Records) came at a time when the leading US classical music labels RCA Victor Red Seal and Columbia Masterworks were dropping most of their unlucrative classical artists and pressing inferior quality records. DGG's high quality recordings and pressings attracted artists such as Arthur Fiedler and the Boston Pops Orchestra (who had recorded for RCA Victor since 1935) and Leonard Bernstein (after several years with Columbia) to DGG/Polydor. In 1987, Siemens sold off its interest in PolyGram, and Philips became the majority shareholder. In 1998, the Seagram company of Canada purchased Deutsche Grammophon and PolyGram on behalf of its Universal Music Group subsidiary. Since then, UMG was sold and became a division of Vivendi until its IPO in September 2021.

In 1983 Deutsche Grammophon pioneered the introduction of the compact disc to the mass market, debuting classical music performed by Herbert von Karajan and the Berlin Philharmonic, the first recording being Richard Strauss's Eine Alpensinfonie.

In 2022, Deutsche Grammophon and Universal Music Group launched STAGE+, a multimedia streaming service featuring live streams of concerts presented by artists signed to the label, as well as on-demand access to archival video performances of concerts from the label's catalogue and audio streaming of albums from Deutsche Grammophon and Decca Classics, as well as classical albums released on the UMG-distributed ECM Records label. Following UMG's 2023 acquisition of Hyperion Records, select Hyperion albums have been added to STAGE+'s library.

== Artists ==
Deutsche Grammophon has a huge back catalogue of notable recordings. The company was reissuing a portion of it in its Originals series; compact disc releases are noted for their vinyl record stylized design. It is also releasing some of American Decca Records' albums from the 1940s and 1950s, such as those that Leonard Bernstein made for Decca in 1953, and the classic Christmas album that features Ronald Colman's starring in A Christmas Carol and Charles Laughton's narrating Mr. Pickwick's Christmas. Along with the American Decca Records classical music catalogue, Deutsche Grammophon also manages the classical music catalogue of ABC Records, including Westminster Records which, along with American Decca, were part of MCA Records.

Although Deutsche Grammophon acquired the reputation of releasing mainstream classical recordings, from the 1960s onwards it released an increasing number of avant-garde recordings (initially under the Avant-Garde imprint), including Bruno Maderna, David Bedford, Cornelius Cardew, Luigi Nono and improvisations. It also released the majority of the compositions of Karlheinz Stockhausen until the composer bought the rights to the recordings and re-released them on his own label. Other German composers associated with the label included Paul Hindemith and Hans Werner Henze.

Contemporary composers whose works were released by Deutsche Grammophon include Hildur Guðnadóttir, Sofia Gubaidulina, Oliver Knussen, Mark-Anthony Turnage, Mohammed Fairouz, Péter Eötvös, Luigi Nono, Sven Helbig, Jonny Greenwood, Bryce Dessner, Witold Lutosławski, Philip Glass, Vangelis, Tori Amos and Max Richter.

The conductor most associated with the label is Herbert von Karajan. Other conductors under contract included Ferenc Fricsay, Carlos Kleiber, Karl Böhm, Karl Richter, Eugen Jochum, Rafael Kubelík, Leonard Bernstein, Pierre Boulez, Claudio Abbado, Jean-Christophe Spinosi, and Christian Thielemann. Recent signings include Long Yu, Yannick Nézet-Séguin, Gustavo Dudamel, Hera Hyesang Park, and Myung-whun Chung.

The label's Recomposed series features electronic adaptations of classical works.

- Conductors: Claudio Abbado, Daniel Barenboim, Leonard Bernstein, Karl Böhm, Pierre Boulez, Myung-whun Chung, Gustavo Dudamel, Ferenc Fricsay, Wilhelm Furtwängler, John Eliot Gardiner, Reinhard Goebel, Nikolaus Harnoncourt, Jakub Hrůša, Eugen Jochum, Herbert von Karajan, Carlos Kleiber, Rafael Kubelík, James Levine, Cristian Măcelaru, Igor Markevitch, Zubin Mehta, Andris Nelsons, Hera Hyesang Park, Trevor Pinnock, Mikhail Pletnev, Yannick Nézet-Séguin, Karl Richter, William Steinberg, Christian Thielemann, Long Yu, Jean-Christophe Spinosi
- Chamber Ensembles: Amadeus Quartet, Beaux Arts Trio, Emerson String Quartet, Hagen Quartet, Janáček Quartet, LaSalle Quartet, Melos Quartet
- Choir and Vocal Ensembles: Accademia Nazionale di Santa Cecilia Chorus, Ambrosian Opera Chorus, Arnold Schoenberg Choir, Bavarian Radio Chorus, Bayerische Staatsoper Chorus, Chor der St.-Hedwigs-Kathedrale, Chicago Symphony Chorus, Deutsche Oper Berlin Chorus, Eric Ericson Chamber Choir, Knabenchor Berlin, La Scala Chorus, Maggio Musicale Fiorentino Chorus, MDR Rundfunkchor, Metropolitan Opera Chorus, Monteverdi Choir, Mormon Tabernacle Choir, Radio Chorus of the NOS, Hilversum, RIAS Chamber Choir, Sistine Chapel Choir, Sofia National Opera Chorus, Swedish Radio Choir, Vienna Boys' Choir, Vienna State Opera Choir, Vocalensemble Rastatt, Wiener Singverein, Zürich Opera House Chorus
- Orchestras: Bavarian Radio Symphony Orchestra, Berlin Radio Symphony Orchestra, Boston Symphony Orchestra, Berlin Philharmonic, Chamber Orchestra of Europe, Chicago Symphony Orchestra, Concerto Köln, Dresden Staatskapelle, The English Baroque Soloists, The English Concert, Leningrad Philharmonic Orchestra, London Symphony Orchestra, Los Angeles Philharmonic Orchestra, Musica Antiqua Köln, New York Philharmonic, Orchestre National de France, Orchestre Révolutionnaire et Romantique, Orpheus Chamber Orchestra, Philharmonia Orchestra, Vienna Philharmonic
- Singers: Ildar Abdrazakov, Roberto Alagna, Ettore Bastianini, Kathleen Battle, Benjamin Bernheim, Grace Bumbry, Montserrat Caballé, Ildebrando D'Arcangelo, Dietrich Fischer-Dieskau, Plácido Domingo, Oralia Dominguez, Franco Fagioli, Julie Fuchs, Elina Garanca, Matthias Goerne, Gundula Janowitz, Siegfried Jerusalem, Magdalena Kožená, Edith Mathis, Jolanda Meneguzzer, Anna Netrebko, Jessye Norman, Anne Sofie von Otter, René Pape, Patricia Petibon, Anna Prohaska, Thomas Quasthoff, Christine Schäfer, Peter Schreier, Leopold Simoneau, Antonietta Stella, Rita Streich, Cheryl Studer, Bryn Terfel, Jonathan Tetelman, Gerhard Unger, Rolando Villazón, Fritz Wunderlich, Teresa Żylis-Gara, Agnes Obel
- Pianists: Pierre-Laurent Aimard, Giuseppe Albanese, Géza Anda, Martha Argerich, Daniel Barenboim, Rafał Blechacz, Rudolf Buchbinder, Seong-Jin Cho, Đặng Thái Sơn, Christoph Eschenbach, Friedrich Gulda, Hélène Grimaud, Clara Haskil, Vladimir Horowitz, Walter Gieseking, Emil Gilels, Wilhelm Kempff, Evgeny Kissin, Lang Lang, Yundi Li, Bruce Liu, Jan Lisiecki, Arturo Benedetti Michelangeli, Víkingur Ólafsson, Alice Sara Ott, Murray Perahia, Maria João Pires, Menahem Pressler, Ivo Pogorelić, Maurizio Pollini, André Previn, Max Richter, Sviatoslav Richter, Francesco Tristano Schlimé, Rudolf Serkin, Grigory Sokolov, Daniil Trifonov, Anatol Ugorski, Yuja Wang, Alexis Weissenberg, Ingolf Wunder, Krystian Zimerman
- Violinists: Yuri Bashmet, Lisa Batiashvili, Renaud Capuçon, María Dueñas, Joshua Epstein, Christian Ferras, David Garrett, Reinhard Goebel, Hilary Hahn, Daniel Hope, Bomsori Kim, Gidon Kremer, Daniel Lozakovich, Nathan Milstein, Mikhail Simonyan, Shlomo Mintz, Anne-Sophie Mutter, Itzhak Perlman, Nemanja Radulović, Vadim Repin, Wolfgang Schneiderhan, Gil Shaham, Esther Yoo, Pinchas Zukerman
- Cellists: Pierre Fournier, Mischa Maisky, Truls Mørk, Siegfried Palm, Mstislav Rostropovich, Kian Soltani, Camille Thomas
- Trumpet: Maurice André, Philip Jones, Adolph Herseth, Wynton Marsalis, Rafael Méndez, Philip Smith, Pierre Thibaud

== Catalogue Series ==
- 100 Years Salzburger Festspiele
- 20/21
- Archiv Produktion (Early and Baroque music)
- The Artist's Album
- Classic Opera
- Classical Bytes
- Complete Beethoven Edition
- Claudio Abaddo Complete Recordings on DG and Decca
- Bach 333 Complete Edition (with Decca)
- Carlos Kleiber Complete Recordings on DG
- Centenary Collection
- Conductors & Orchestras
- Collectors Edition
- Classical Choice
- Classikan
- DG 111
- DG 120
- DG 2 CD
- Edge
- Entrée
- The Essentials
- Ferenc Friscay Complete Recordings on DG
- First Choice
- Galleria
- Grand Prix (recipients of Grand Prix du Disque)
- John Eliot Gardiner Complete Recordings on DG and Archiv
- Karajan 1960s, 1970s, 1980s
- Karajan Choral and Sacred Recordings
- Karajan Complete Recordings On DG And Decca
- Karajan Master Recordings
- Karajan Gold
- Karajan Symphony Edition
- Karl Bohm Complete Orchestral Recordings on DG
- Rafeal Kubelik The Complete Recordings on DG
- Lorin Maazel Complete Recordings on DG
- Martha Argerich The Collection
- Marhta Argerich The Complete Recordings on DG
- Mozart 225 Complete Edition (with Decca, 200 CD set)
- "Mozarts Meisterwerke" - Mozart Master Works (25 CDs)
- LA Phil 100 Years
- LA Phil Live
- The Leonard Bernstein Collection
- Leonard Bernstein Complete Recordings on DG and Decca
- Opera House
- Oper auf Deutsch
- Original Masters
- The Originals - Legendary Recordings
- The Original Source Series
- Spotlight
- Steinway Legends
- Trio (3 CD sets)
- Weekend Classics
- Westminster Legacy
- Wilhelm Kempff Edition
- Wolfgang Schneiderhan Complete Recordings on DG
- The Works
- Virtuoso
