= Joseph Sanders =

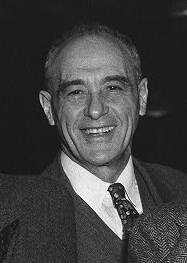
- Sanders c. 1920s
- Born: 18 October 1877; Gehrden, Germany
- Died: 20 August 1960 (aged 82); Washington D.C., United States
- Education: Washington D.C. Public school, Industrial School of Hannover (Germany), Corcoran Scientific School
- Spouse: Hannah E. Berliner
- Children: 3

Joseph Sanders (18 October 1877 – 1960) was a German-American who worked alongside his uncle Emile Berliner to develop the record player, the first controllable helicopter and one of the earliest production rotary engines.

== Career ==
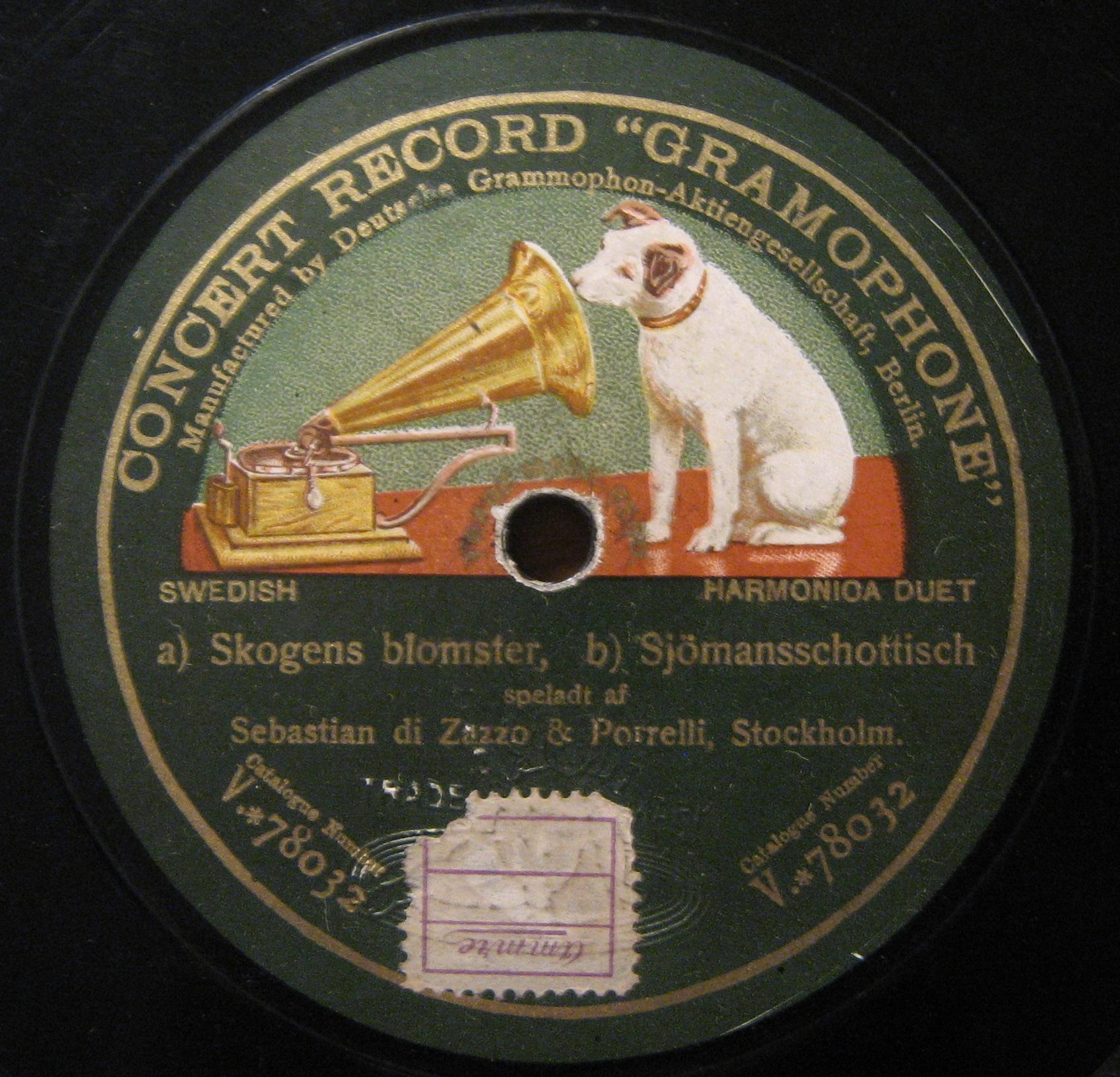
A Deutsche Grammophon record

In 1898, Sanders was sent to Hannover, Germany by Emile Berliner to found the Deutsche Grammophon company with his other uncle, Joseph Berliner. The company ran a subsidiary Polyphonwerke Aktiengesellschaft, that would press records for use in America under the name Opera Disc Company.

In 1902 Emile Berliner and Joseph Sanders were issued U.S. patent #715003 for a recording device for records.

In June 1914, Sanders became the general manager of the Gyro Motor Company in Washington D.C. He purchased the assets in May 1917, forming the Gyro Company.

Sanders was active in supporting his community association in Forrest Hills. He died at the age of 81, leaving over half a million dollars to various local charities.

Sanders' son, Robert, would remain in the aviation business. Becoming sales manager of his partner's son Henry Berliner's Erco Corporation in Riverdale, Maryland, eventually buying the assets, running the company as Sanders Aviation.
