= American Propeller Manufacturing Company =

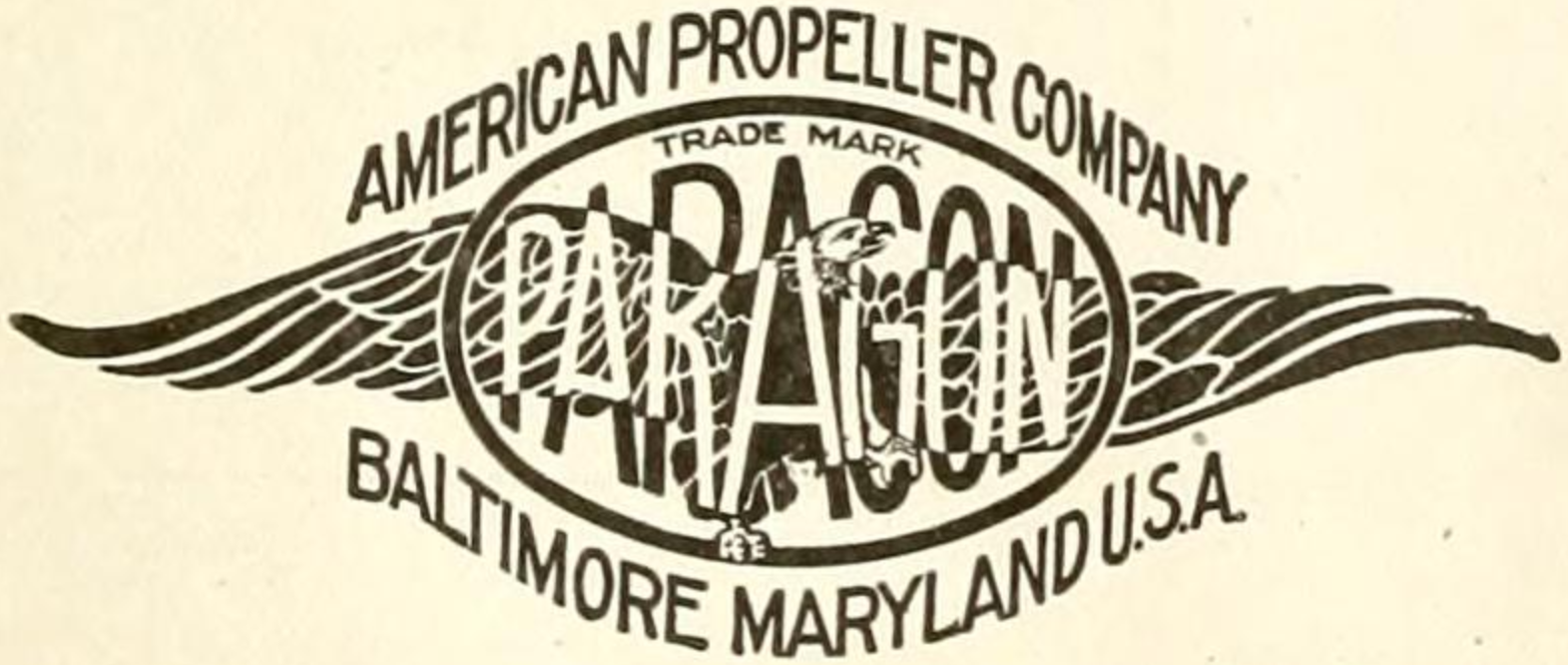
- Founded: 1909 in Washington, D.C.
- Fate: Acquired
- Successor: Bendix Aviation Corporation
- Headquarters: Baltimore, Maryland, United States
- Key people: J.M. Creamer; Spencer Heath
- Products: Paragon Propellers
- Number of employees: 1,200 (1918)

American Propeller and Manufacturing Company, in Baltimore manufactured 75 percent of all propellers used by America in World War I.

== History ==
APMC was founded by a patent lawyer and engineering consultant Spencer Heath. His clients included Simon Lake, inventor of the even-keel-submerging submarine, and Emile Berliner, inventor of the flat-disk phonograph record. Heath helped Berliner design and build the first rotary engine blades used in helicopters while working in Washington as general manager of the Gyro Motor Company. Heath developed and first mass-produced airplane propellers at APMC. In 1922 he founded Paragon Engineers inc, and demonstrated the first engine-powered and controlled, variable and reversible pitch propeller.

AMPC was initially founded in Washington D.C to build low-production experimental and custom propellers under the name Paragon. In 1912 the company moved to Baltimore, Maryland. Initial propellers were built with Mahogany wood, followed by Oak with sprucewood cores, and by 1915 APMC converted to solid oak construction. With the onset of World War I, AMPC became the largest manufacturer of wooden aircraft propellers in America by 1918. Four manufacturing plants operated in Baltimore to meet World War I production contracts . The 95,000 sq foot plant number four was constructed in 1918 specifically for propeller production with a capacity of 300-500 propellers per day. An additional 90 propellers a day were produced at the other three plants. The plants used 158,000 sqft of dry kilns to process wood and custom duplicating machines that reduce the number of lathes required for the construction process. Over 25,000 propellers were produced in World War I with 8000 delivered to the Royal Flying Corps Canada.

In 1937, the company took a case to the United States Supreme court. The company stated it was owed income from contracts ending in 1918, the government counterclaimed several years later that it was overcharged. The difference between the amounts was roughly $12,000 in favor of APMC. While each side litigated who owed each other for over a decade, both sides charged interest, changing the amount to be payment to a penalty of over $36,000. The court ruled in favor of APMC, stating the counter claim failed to provide adequate evidence initially, so accrued interest could not be charged

== On display ==
An example of a Paragon propeller is on display at the EAA Airventure Museum in Oshkosh, Wisconsin.

== See also ==
- List of aircraft propeller manufacturers
