= Albanesi =

Albanesi is an Italian surname meaning "Albanian", in reference to the Arbëreshë people (Italo-Albanians) of southern Italy. It is common in southern Italy and rare elsewhere in the country. Notable people with the surname include:

- Angelo Albanesi (late 18th century), Italian engraver
- Carlo Albanesi (1858–1926), Italian composer, pianist, teacher, and examiner
- Meggie Albanesi (1899–1923), British stage and film actress, daughter of Carlo

== See also ==
- Albanese
- Names of the Albanians and Albania
