= Cusumano =

Cusumano is a Sicilian surname. Variant spellings include Cusumano and Cosimano (a variation found in Western Sicily). Cusumano is the spelling used in western Sicily and Cosimano is found in eastern Sicily. There are also many other variants that conform to a lot of known dialectal conventions of those parts of Sicily.

The surname comes from a personal name which De Felice suggests may be a fusion of two saints’ names: Cosmas + Damiano, with a loss of the last syllable of one and the first of the other. Alternatively, Caracausi takes "Cusumano" to be a regional variant of the Late Greek personal name Kosmas (see Cosma) or a short form of an old personal name beginning with Kosm-. He also suggests that it could be derived from the Arabic "Quzman".

The name also means "to sew by hand", which could mean that the name was given to someone in the village that sewed.

Notable people with the surname include:

- Camille Cusumano, American author of Sicilian descent
- Michael A. Cusumano, professor at the MIT Sloan School of Management
- Stefano Cusumano (born 1948), also known as Nuccio Cusumano, Italian politician
