= Giacomo Cusmano =

Italian priest

Blessed Giacomo(jacob)Cusmano
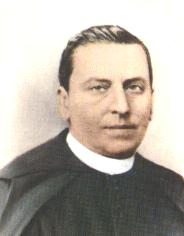

Priest
- Born: 15 March 1834; Palermo, Kingdom of the Two Sicilies
- Died: 14 March 1888 (aged 53); Palermo, Kingdom of Italy
- Venerated in: Roman Catholic Church
- Beatified: 30 October 1983, Saint Peter's Square, Vatican City by Pope John Paul II
- Feast: 14 March
- Attributes: Priest's cassock
- Patronage: Sisters Servants of the Poor; Congregatio Missionariorum Servorum Pauperum

Giacomo Cusmano (15 March 1834 - 14 March 1888) was an Italian Roman Catholic priest and the founder of the "Congregatio Missionariorum Servorum Pauperum" which is also known as the "Boccone del Povero" (Morsel of the Poor). Cusmano also established the Sisters Servants of the Poor. He was beatified by Pope John Paul II on 30 October 1983.

His older sister was Vincenzina Cusmano, who joined his female religious order and was declared Venerable in May 2017, putting her on the path to beatification.

== Life ==
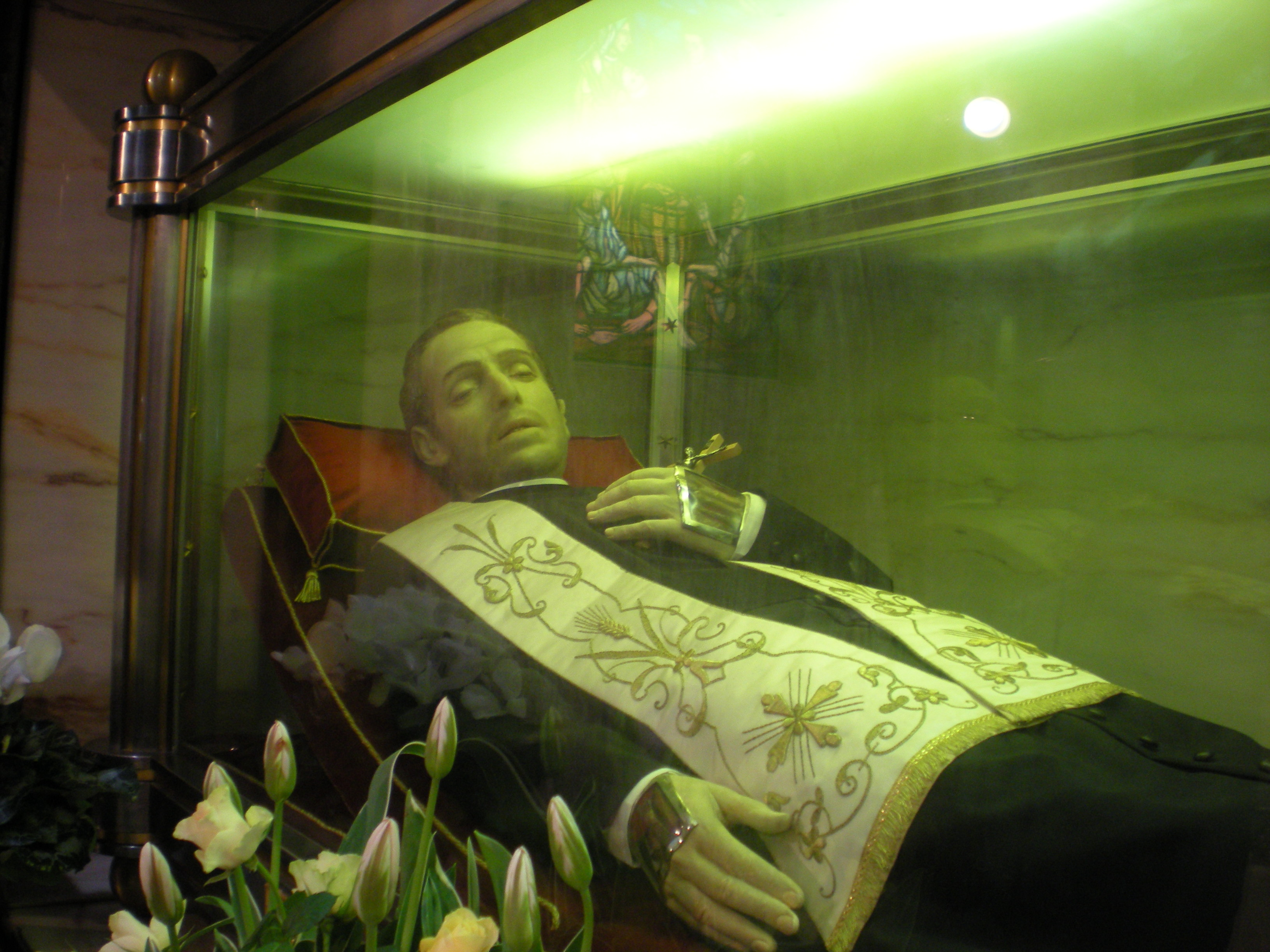
Tomb.

Giacomo Cusmano was born on 15 March 1834 in Palermo. He was the fourth of five children and his eldest sister was the Vincenzina Cusmano.

As a child and adolescent he attended the Jesuit "Collegio Massimo" in Palermo in the midst of anti-clerical civil strife in the 1848 Sicilian revolution. He undertook medical studies at the Collegio and in 1851 transferred to the school of medicine at the Royal University of Palermo. In 1852 his father died and he had familial responsibilities at the farms and estates in San Giuseppe Jato that the household ran. During this time he became aware of the plight of the poor peasants who worked under him during the time of the harvest. Most of those peasants were amazed that he "showed us courtesy, kindness, and even gratitude". The peasants would further remark that "rather than commanding he would softly ask". Often when coming from the countryside to the town he would surrender his horse to some poor farmer suffering the long trek on foot.

Despite these commitments he graduated in medicine with honors on 11 June 1855 at the age of 21.

After graduating he spent most of his time in the continuous care of the poor, not in Palermo, but in San Giuseppe Jato, where commitments multiplied. In 1859, at the outbreak of the second war of independence, the Resorgimento, the revolutionary Enrico Albanese, a friend of Garibaldi and his family doctor, approached Cusmano, with whom he had woven an excellent relationship throughout the years of study, and asked him to join them to fight in the revolution. Saddened by the plight of the poor of his town, whose misery was not diminished but rather increased dramatically after the riots of 1848, he declined and continued to minister to the poor of San Giuseppe Jato.

His affection and concern for the poor led him to seek the priesthood and on 22 December 1860, after only one year of study at the theological school of Don Pietro Boccone, canon of the cathedral of Palemo, Cusmano was ordained as a priest in the private chapel of the auxiliary bishop of Palermo by Domenico Ciluffo: this while the church and its clerics were increasingly disenfranchised by the new Italian government. With Sicily annexed to the new unified Italy, the church lost its property and good will, and many employees of the Bourbon regime lost their jobs, thus increasing the number of poor struggling with hunger. Cusmano then began to think of a new undertaking for the assistance of the hungry.

Over several years, starting with a small effort to provide a "Morsel of the Poor", in the parish house of Palermo's church of the Holy Martyrs, Cusmano proceeded to establish similar but larger institutions in Terre Rosse, Valguarnera, Monreale and Santa Caterina.

Then on 21 November 1887 in Palermo's Church of San Marco, the "Congregation Missionary Servants of the Poor" was established in the presence of the Archbishop of Palermo Cardinal Celesia. The order was composed of priests required to live in a religious community having the aim of keeping alive the spirit of the Morsel of the Poor and evangelizing the rural poor. The first among them was Cusmano, who received the congratulations of the archbishop, who called him the "Don Bosco of the South".

Cusmano died in 1888 just a day prior to his birthday.

== Beatification ==
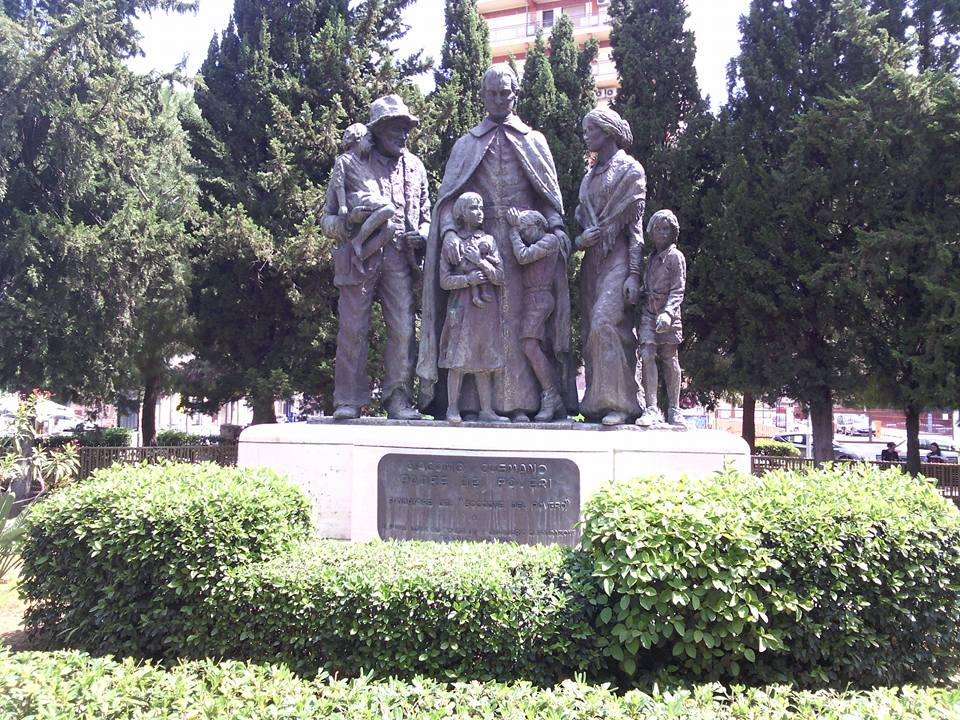
Giacomo Cusmano Monument, Palermo

The informative process for the beatification cause commenced in Palermo. His writings received the full approval of theologians on 3 February 1946 after the team acknowledged that his writings were in line with the magisterium of the Roman Catholic Church. These two processes were completed despite the fact that the formal introduction of the cause was not until 24 May 1961 under Pope John XXIII in which he was granted the title of Servant of God. This allowed for the apostolic process to take place. Both the apostolic and informative processes were validated in Rome by the Congregation of Rites on 11 January 1969.

On 2 April 1984 he was declared to be Venerable after Pope John Paul II recognized that Cusmano had lived a life of heroic virtue.

The process for an alleged miracle was held in the diocese of its origin in 1964 and the investigation validated in Rome at the same time the informative and apostolic processes were ratified in 1969. John Paul II approved the healing to be a credible miracle in 1983 which enabled the pontiff to preside over the beatification on 30 October 1983.

The supposed second miracle was investigated in the decades following the beatification while the independent investigation was validated in Rome on 29 April 2005. A medical board approved the healing as a miracle on 3 December 2009.

A monument dedicated to Cusmano was built in the 1980s in Palermo's Piazza Campolo.
