= Names of the Albanians and Albania =

The Albanians (Albanian: Shqiptarët) and their country Albania (Shqipëria) have been identified by many ethnonyms. The native endonym is Shqiptar. The name "Albanians" (Latin: Albanenses/Arbanenses) was used in medieval Greek and Latin documents that gradually entered European languages from which other similar derivative names emerged. Linguists believe that the alb part in the root word originates from an Indo-European term for a type of mountainous topography, meaning "hill, mountain", also present in Alps. Through the root word alban and its rhotacized equivalents arban, albar, and arbar, the term in Albanian became rendered as Arbëreshë (Gheg Albanian: Arbëneshë) for the people and Arbëria (Gheg Albanian: Arbënia) for the country.

Contemporary Albanian language employs a different ethnonym, with modern Albanians referring to themselves as Shqiptarë and to their country as Shqipëria. Two etymologies have been proposed for this ethnonym. One connects it to the verb 'pronounce' (shqiptoj), deriving from Latin excipere. In this instance, the Albanian endonym, like many others, would originally have been a term connoting "those who speak [intelligibly, the same language]"; that is, "those who speak shqip," with shqip referring to the Albanian language itself. The other one derives the name from the Albanian word for eagle (shqiponjë). The eagle was a common heraldic symbol for many Albanian dynasties in the Late Middle Ages and came to be a symbol of the Albanians in general; for example, the flag of Skanderbeg, whose family's symbol was the black double-headed eagle, as displayed on the Albanian flag.

Attested from 14th century onward, the placename Shqipëria and the ethnic demonym Shqiptarë gradually replaced Arbëria and Arbëreshë amongst Albanian speakers between the late 17th and early 18th centuries. That era brought about religious and other sociopolitical changes. As such a new and generalised response by Albanians based on ethnic and linguistic consciousness to this new and different Ottoman world emerging around them was a change in ethnonym.

== Arbënesh/Arbëresh (Albanian) ==
Arbën, Arbëneshë, Arbënuer (as rendered in northern Gheg dialects) and Arbër, Arbëreshë, Arbëror (as rendered in southern Tosk dialects) are the old native terms denoting ancient and medieval Albanians used by Albanians. The Albanian language was referred to as Arbërisht (Gheg Albanian: Arbënisht). While the country was called Arbëni, definite: Arbënia and Arbëri, definite: Arbëria by Albanians. These terms as an endonym and as native toponyms for the country are based on the same common root alban and its rhotacized equivalents arban, albar, and arbar. The national ethnonym Albanian has derived from Albanoi, an Illyrian tribe mentioned by Ptolemy with their centre at the city of Albanopolis, located in modern-day central Albania, near the city of Krujë. The alb part in the root word for all these terms is believed by linguists be an Indo-European word for a type of mountainous topography, meaning "hill, mountain", also present in Alps. The Lab, also Labe, Labi; Albanian sub-group and geographic/ethnographic region of Labëri, definite: Labëria in Albania are also endonyms formed from the root alb. These are derived from the syllable cluster alb undergoing metathesis within Slavic to lab and reborrowed in that form into Albanian.

Terms derived from all those endonyms as exonyms appear in Byzantine sources from the eleventh century onward and are rendered as Albanoi, Arbanitai and Arbanites and in Latin and other Western documents as Albanenses and Arbanenses. The first Byzantine writers to mention Albanians in an ethnic sense are Michael Attaliates (in the book History) and Anna Comnena (in the book Alexiad), referring to them as Albanoi and Arbanitai, in the 11th century. In later Byzantine usage, the terms "Arbanitai" and "Albanoi" with a range of variants were used interchangeably, while sometimes the same groups were also called by the classicising name Illyrians. The first reference to the Albanian language dates to the year 1285.

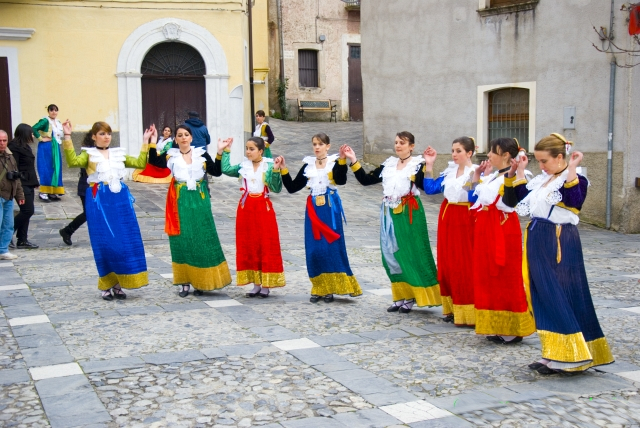
Arbëreshë traditional vallje ("dance").

The country was known in Byzantine sources as Arbanon (Άρβανον) and in Latin sources as Arbanum. In medieval Serbian sources, the ethnonym for the country derived from the Latin term after undergoing linguistic metathesis was rendered as Rabna (Рабна) and Raban (Рабан), while the adjective was Rabanski (Rабански). From these ethnonyms, names for Albanians were also derived in other languages that were or still are in use. In English Albanians; Italian Albanesi; German Albaner; Greek Arvanites, Alvanitis (Αλβανίτης) plural: Alvanites (Αλβανίτες), Alvanos (Αλβανός) plural: Alvanoi (Αλβανοί); Turkish Arnaut, Arnavut; South Slavic languages Arbanasi (Арбанаси), Albanci (Албанци) and so on. The term Arbëreshë is still used as an endonym and exonym for Albanians that migrated to Italy during the Middle Ages, the Arbëreshë. It is also used as an endonym by the Arvanites in Greece. Within the Balkans, Aromanians still use a similar term, Arbinesh, in the Aromanian language for contemporary Albanians.

== Arbanasi ==
Arbanas (Арбанас), plural: Arbanasi (Арбанаси); is the old ethnonym that the South Slavs, such as the Bulgarians and Serbs, used to denote Albanians, dating back to the Middle Ages. Arbanaski (Арбанаски), Arbanski (Арбански) and Arbanaški (Арбанашки) are adjectives derived from those terms. The term Arbănas was also used by Romanians for Albanians. They first appear with this ethnonym in a Bulgarian manuscript dated 1000–1018, during the reign of Tsar Samuel, in which Arbanasi (Albanians) are mentioned as being half-believers (i.e. non-Orthodox Christians). The term was in use amongst South Slavs until the mid 20th century. The name Arbanasi is still used as an exonym for a small Albanian community in Croatia on the Dalmatian coast that migrated there during the 18th century. In modern South Slavic languages the term is Albanac.

== Arvanites ==
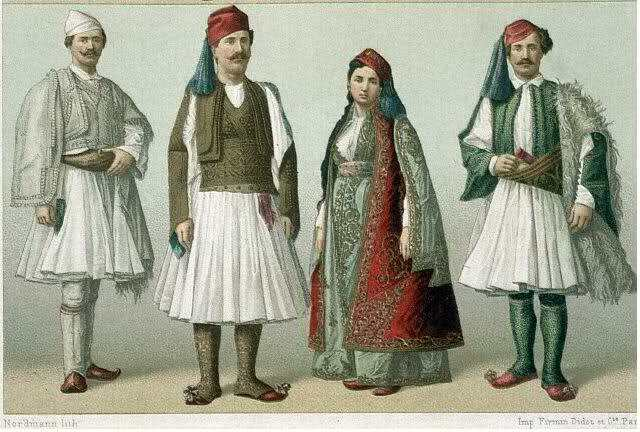
Albanians in the 19th century

Arvanitis (Αρβανίτης), plural: Arvanites (Αρβανίτες); is a term that was historically used amongst the wider Greek-speaking population to describe an Albanian speaker regardless of their religious affiliations until the interwar period, along with Alvanoi (Αλβανοί). The name was established in Greek language from the original ethnonym Alvanitis (Άλβανίτης), which in return derived from Alvanos (Άλβάνος). The name appears as the ethnonym of Albanians in medieval Byzantine sources, originally as "Arbanitai", (in Greek language the letter 'b' is pronounced as 'v'; hence "Arvanitai") and was rendered in modern Greek as "Arvanites".

Today, the term Arvanites is used by Greeks to refer to descendants of Albanians or Arbëreshë that migrated to southern Greece during the medieval era and who currently self identify as Greeks, as a result of assimilation. Sometimes its variant Alvanites may be used instead. In the region of Epirus within Greece today, the term Arvanitis is still used for an Albanian speaker regardless of their citizenship and religion. While the term Arvanitika (Αρβανίτικα) is used within Greece for all varieties of the Albanian language spoken there, whereas within Western academia the term is used for the Albanian language spoken in Southern Greece. Alongside these ethnonyms the term Arvanitia (Αρβανιτιά) for the country has also been used by Greek society in folklore, sayings, riddles, dances and toponyms. For example, some Greek writers used the term Arvanitia alongside the older Greek term Epirus for parts or all of contemporary Albania and modern Epirus in Greece until the 19th century.

== Arnaut/Arnavut ==
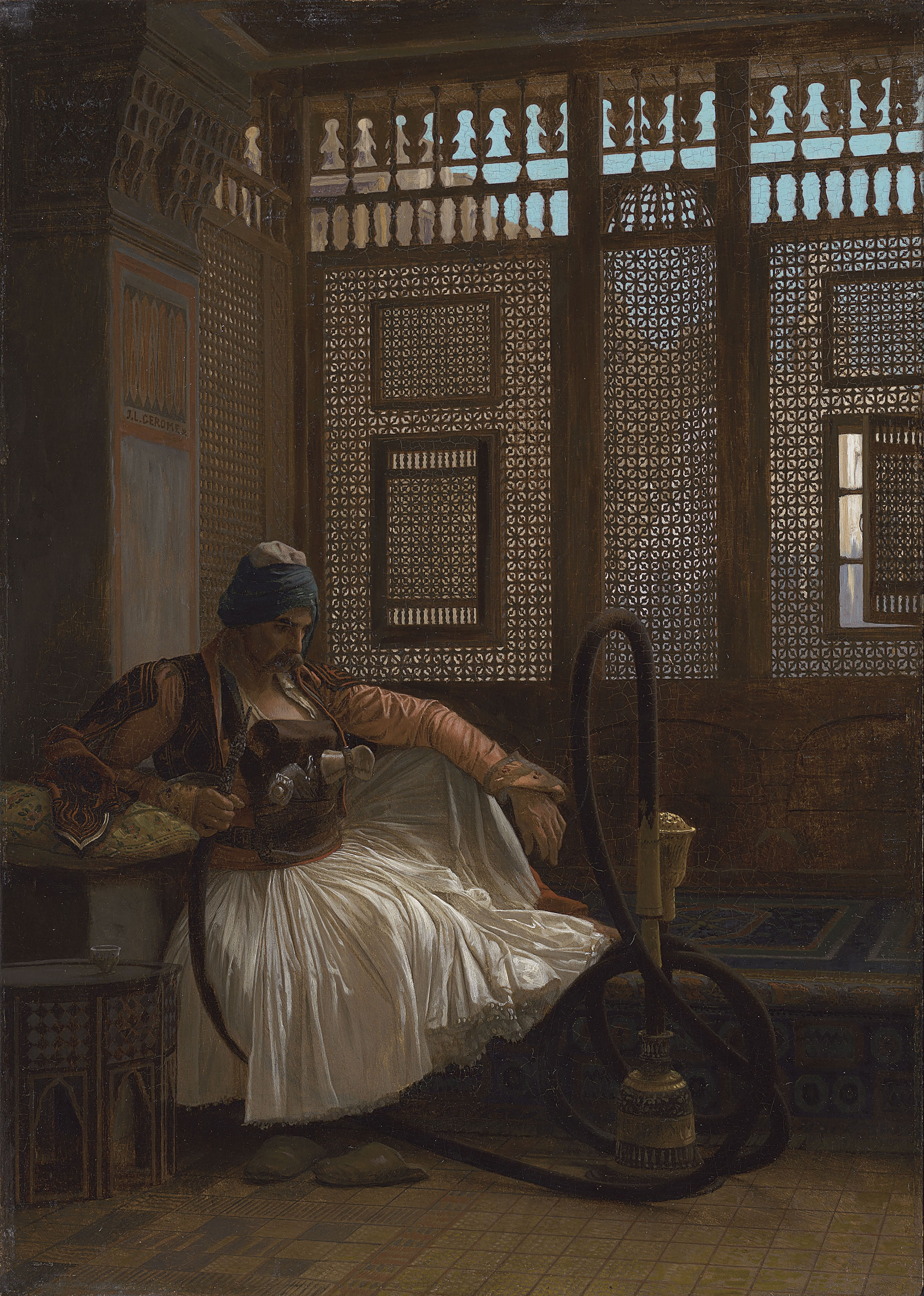
Arnaut smoking in Cairo — Jean-Léon Gérôme 1865

Arnaut (ارناود), Arvanid (اروانيد), Arnavud (آرناوود), plural: Arnavudlar (آرناوودلار): modern Turkish: Arnavut, plural: Arnavutlar; are ethnonyms used mainly by Ottoman and contemporary Turks for Albanians with Arnavutça being the name of the Albanian language. These ethnonyms are derived from the Greek term Arvanites and entered Turkish after the syllable cluster van was rearranged through metathesis to nav giving the final Turkish forms as Arnavut and Arnaut. Meanwhile, in Greek the name Arvanitis was derived from the original name Alvanitis [Άλβανίτης] (in return derived from Alvanos [Άλβάνος]).

In the late eighteenth and early nineteenth centuries due to socio-political disturbances by some Albanians in the Balkans the term was used as an ethnic marker for Albanians in addition to the usual millet religious terminology to identify people in Ottoman state records. While the term used in Ottoman sources for the country was Arnavudluk (آرناوودلق) for areas such as Albania, Western Macedonia, Southern Serbia, Kosovo, parts of northern Greece and southern Montenegro. During the late Ottoman period, government officials used the terms Arnavudlar (Albanians) and Arnavud kavmı (the Albanian people) for the ethnic group, along with the terms Ghegs and Tosks for northern and southern Albanian ethno-cultural subgroups. At the same time Albanian regions within the empire were referred to as Arnavudluk (Albania) and the geographic terms Gegalık (Ghegland) and Toskalık (Toskland) were also used in government documents. In modern Turkish Arnavutluk refers only to the Republic of Albania.

Historically as an exonym the Turkish term Arnaut has also been used for instance by some Western Europeans as a synonym for Albanians that were employed as soldiers in the Ottoman army. The term Arnā’ūṭ (الأرناؤوط) also entered the Arabic language as an exonym for Albanian communities that settled in the Levant during the Ottoman era onward, especially for those residing in Syria. The term Arnaut (Арнаут), plural: Arnauti (Арнаути) has also been borrowed into Balkan south Slavic languages like Bulgarian and within Serbian the word has also acquired pejorative connotations regarding Albanians. During the Ottoman era, the name was used for ethnic Albanians regardless of their religious affiliations, just like it is today.

== Albanese ==
Albanese and Albanesi is an Italian surname meaning "Albanian", in reference to the Arbëreshë people (Italo-Albanians) of southern Italy. Among people who have the surname it is common in southern Italy and rare elsewhere in the country. In Venice, the term albanesoti (singular, albanesoto) was used in the 15th and 16th centuries for those Albanians and their descendants who had received Venetian citizenship and lived in Venetian territories in northern Italy.

The term Albanesi was used for some Balkan troops recruited (mid 18th - early 19th centuries) by the Kingdom of Naples that indicated their general origins (without implying ethnic connotations) or fighting style, due to the reputation Albanians held of serving as mercenaries in Ottoman armies.

== Epirot ==
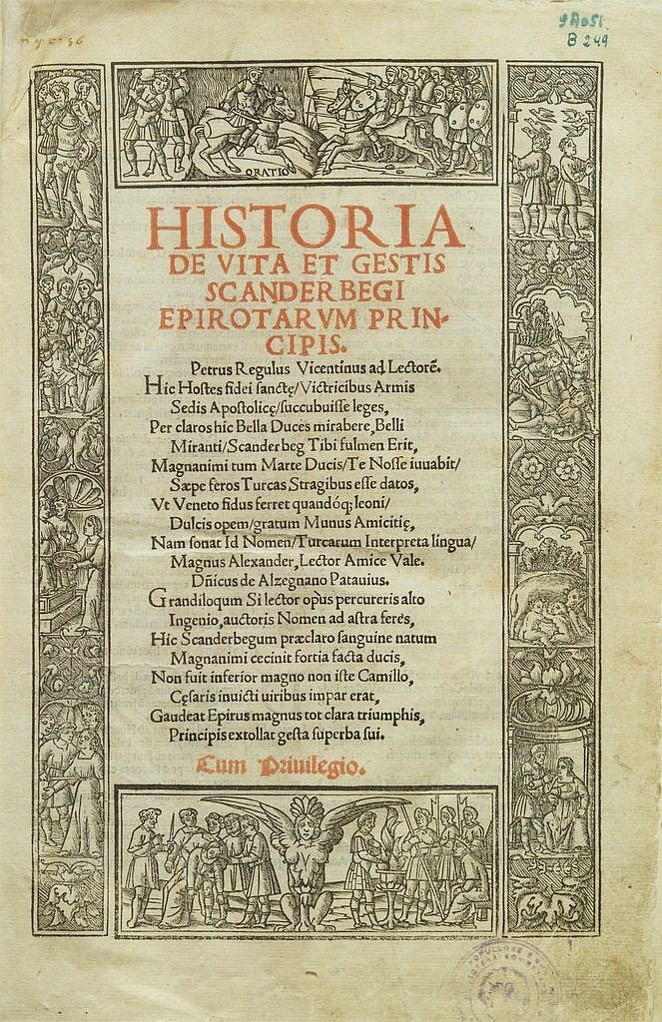
Historia de vita et gestis Scanderbegi, Epirotarum principis ("History of the life and deeds of Scanderbeg, Prince of the Epirots") by Marin Barleti, 1508.

By the Late Middle Ages, during the period of Humanism and the European Renaissance, the terms epirot, Epir and gjuhë epirote (Latin: epirota, Epirus, lingua epirotica) were preferred in the intellectual, literary and clerical circles of the time, used as synonyms for arbën, Arbën, Dheu i Arbënit, Arbëní/rí, abënuer/arbëror, i arbënesh/arbëresh, and later, respectively for shqiptar, Shqipni/Shqipëri, (lingua) shqipe. Subsequently, this linguistic-historical ethnic association was faithfully followed also by the Albanian intellectuals and Catholic clerics during the Middle Ages. On a letter sent to the Prince of Taranto Giovanni Orsini in 1460, the Albanian Lord Skanderbeg wrote: “Se le nostre cronache non mentono, noi ci chiamiamo Epiroti” ("If our chronicles don't lie, we call ourselves Epiroti"). Published in Rome in 1635 by the Albanian bishop and writer Frang Bardhi, the first dictionary of the Albanian language was titled: Dictionarium latino-epiroticum ("Latin-Epirotan [Albanian] dictionary").

== Shqiptar ==
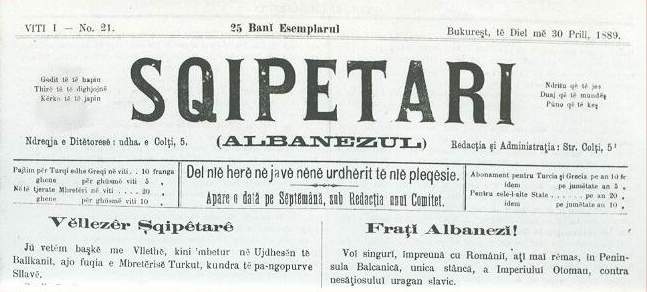
Sqipetari – Albanezul, the newspaper of the Albanian minority in Romania from 1889.

Shqip(ë)tar and Shqyptar (in northern Albanian dialects) is the contemporary endonym used by Albanians for themselves while Shqipëria and Shqypnia/Shqipnia are native toponyms used by Albanians to name their country. All terms share the same Albanian root shqipoj that is derived from the Latin excipere with both terms carrying the meaning of "to speak clearly, to understand". While the Albanian public favours the explanation that the self-ethnonym is derived from the Albanian word for eagle shqipe that is displayed on the national Albanian flag.

The words Shqipëri and Shqiptar are attested from 14th century onward, but it was only at the end of 17th and beginning of the early 18th centuries that the placename Shqipëria and the ethnic demonym Shqiptarë gradually replaced Arbëria and Arbëreshë amongst Albanian speakers in the Balkans. Skipetar is a historical rendering or exonym of the term Shqiptar by some Western European authors in use from the late 18th century to the early 20th century. The term Šiptar (Шиптар), plural: Šiptari (Шиптари) and also Šiftari (Шифтари) or "Šipci" (Шипци) is a derivation used by Balkan Slavic peoples and former states like Yugoslavia; Albanians consider this derogatory due to its negative connotations, preferring Albanci instead.

== See also ==
- Origin of the Albanians
- Albania (placename)
- Albanoi
- History of Albania
- Arbëreshë
- Albanian name
