= Janáček Quartet =

Czech string quartet

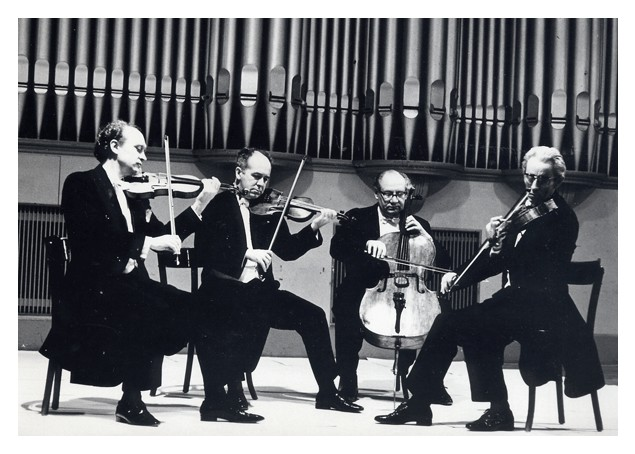
Quarteto Janáček

The Janáček Quartet (Czech: Janáčkovo kvarteto) is a Czech string quartet musical ensemble founded in 1947 which is still currently active.

== Origins and activities ==
The Janáček Quartet was formed in 1947 by students of Váša Černý at the Conservatory of Brno, originally under the name JAMU Quartet. The quartet initially concentrated mainly on Janáček's chamber works. In 1949, the ensemble changed its name to Janáček Quartet, after the Moravian composer Leoš Janáček. Trávníček had some musical ties with him (he was a student of František Kudláček, a member of Moravian Quartet that premiered Janáček’s String Quartet No. 2., "Intimate Letters" and edited the work in cooperation with the composer).

The substitution of Adolf Sýkora for Miroslav Matyáš in 1952 was the only personnel change during the first twenty-five years, until the death of Jiří Trávníček in 1973. Winning a competition in the former West Berlin in 1955 opened the door to great concert halls and since then they have gained international recognition. Recordings by the quartet have won numerous awards, including the Grand Prix of the Charles Cros Academy, and the Preis der deutschen Schallplattenkritik (both for recording of Janáček’s string quartets). The Janáček Quartet has made recordings for Deutsche Grammophon, Supraphon, Eterna, Decca and other labels.

The quartet is unusual among string quartets in performing without sheet music, from memory. It is also noted for a distinctive style of playing.

== Personnel ==
1st violin

- Jiří Trávníček (1947–1973)
- Bohumil Smejkal (1973–1993)
- Jiří Novotný (1993–1996)
- Miloš Vacek (1996-now)

2nd violin

- Miroslav Matyáš (1947–1952)
- Adolf Sýkora (1952–1994)
- Vítězslav Zavadilík (1994-2015)
- Richard Kružík (2015-now)

viola

- Jiří Kratochvíl (1947–1989)
- Ladislav Kyselák (1989–2008)
- Jan Řezníček (2008-now)

cello

- Karel Krafka (1947–1984)
- Břetislav Vybíral (1984-now)
