= Annabelle Gawer =

French and British business theorist

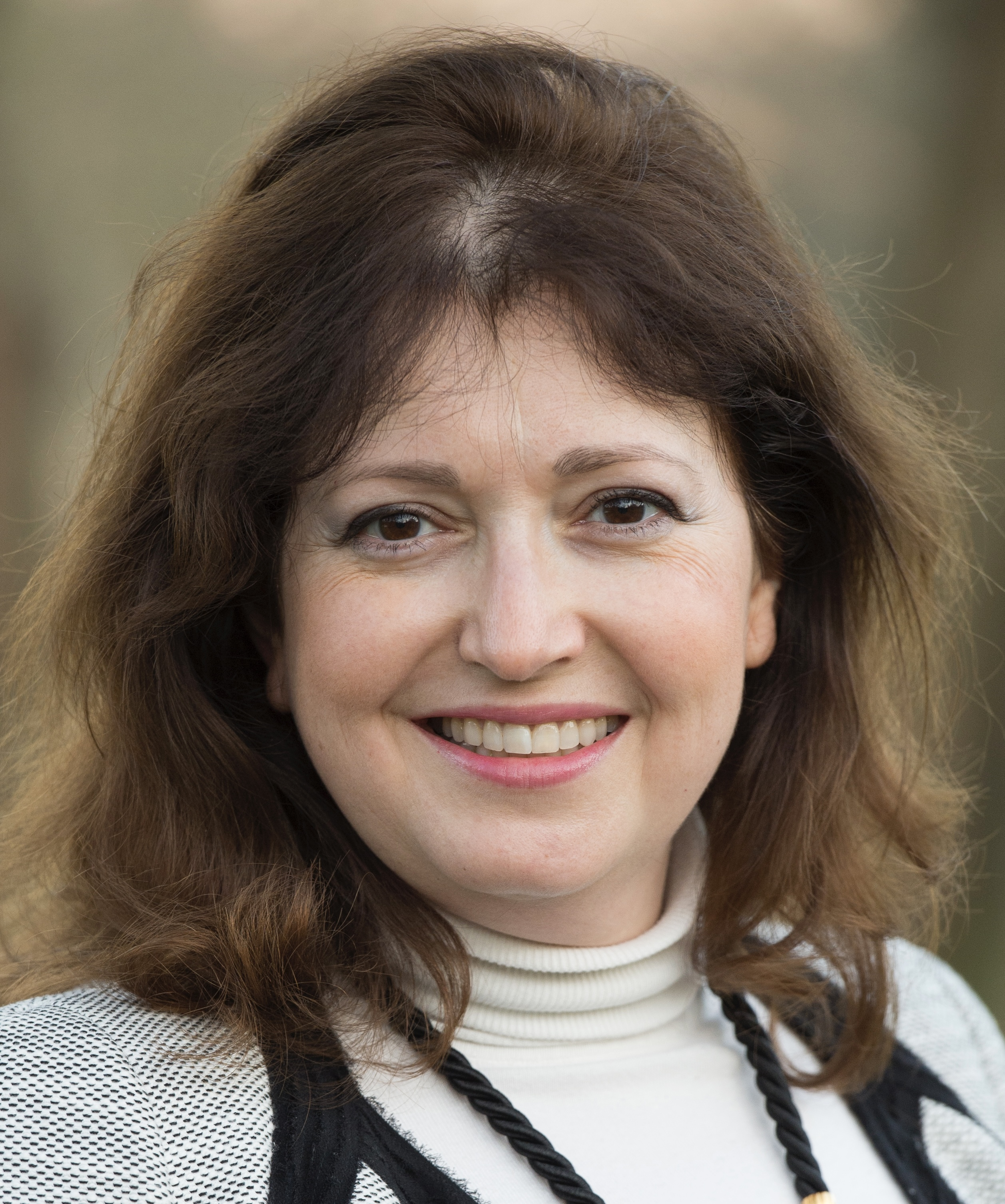

Annabelle Gawer FBA (born 1969) is a French-born British business theorist whose research concerns digital platforms. Born in France, and educated in France and the US, she works in the UK as Chaired Professor in Digital Economy and director of the Centre of Digital Economy at the University of Surrey and she is a visiting professor at IMD.

== Education ==
Annabelle Gawer was born in France, in 1969. In 1992, she earned a master's degree in applied mathematics from Pierre and Marie Curie University, in Paris, an engineering degree from the Nancy School of Mines, and a master's degree in industrial engineering from Stanford University in the US. She completed a Ph.D. in management of technology and innovation from the Massachusetts Institute of Technology in 2000.

== Career ==
After completing her PhD at the MIT Sloan School of Management, Gawer returned to France as an assistant professor of strategy and management at INSEAD in Fontainebleau from 2000 to 2004. From 2004 to 2016, she was an assistant professor and associate professor of strategy and innovation in the business school of Imperial College London. She joined the University of Surrey in 2016. She headed the Department of Digital Economy, Entrepreneurship & Innovation in the Surrey Business School at the University of Surrey from 2018 to 2021.

Since 2023, she has been a visiting professor at IMD, the International Institute for Management Development, Lausanne. From 2020 to 2023, she also held an affiliation as visiting professor of Strategy and Innovation in the Saïd Business School at the University of Oxford.

Annabelle Gawer was named in 2023 independent digital expert for the CMA, the UK Competition and Markets Authority.

== Works ==
=== Books ===
- Platform Leadership: How Intel, Microsoft, and Cisco Drive Industry Innovation (with Michael A. Cusumano, Harvard Business School Press, 2002).
- The Business of Platforms: Strategy in the Age of Digital Competition, Innovation, and Power (with Michael A. Cusumano and David B. Yoffie, HarperCollins, 2019).

=== Policy reports ===
- Online Platforms: Economic and Societal Effects (with Nick Srnicek), Study for the European Parliament, 2021.

=== Edited volumes ===
- Platforms, Markets and Innovation (Edward Elgar, 2009).
- Entrepreneurship, Innovation, and Platforms (with Jeffrey Furman, Brian S. Silverman, and Scott Stern, Emerald Publishing, 2017).

=== Selected journal articles ===
- Gawer, Annabelle (2022). "Digital platforms and ecosystems: remarks on the dominant organizational forms of the digital age". Innovation: Organization and Management. 24 (1): 110–124. doi:10.1080/14479338.2021.1965888. As of November 2024, this was the most read article published by Innovation: Organization and Management.

== Awards and honours ==
Gawer was awarded the Clarivate Highly-Cited Researcher Award in 2022 and 2023, and was both times the only woman in the category of Economics and Business in the UK. This award recognises the top 1% researchers in their field, based on the Web of Science citation index.

Gawer was elected a Fellow of the British Academy in 2023.

Gawer was awarded the 2024 Theory-to-Practice Strategy Award by the Wiener Strategieforum (Vienna Strategy Forum) in recognition of the impact of her research on platforms on business practice.
