= David B. Yoffie =

American academic

David B. Yoffie is the Max and Doris Starr Professor of International Business Administration at Harvard Business School (HBS).

== Education and career ==
Yoffie received his bachelor's degree pa from Brandeis University and his Master's and Ph.D. degrees from Stanford. At Stanford, he taught for two years and later spent more than three years as a visiting scholar between 1995 and 2020. Over the last two decades, he has chaired the Harvard Business School's Strategy department, Harvard's Advanced Management Program, Harvard's Young Presidents' Organization program, Harvard's World President's Organization, Harvard's YPO Gold program, as well as several other executive programs. From 2006 to 2012, he was Senior Associate Dean and Chair of the Harvard Business School's executive education programs. Since 2015, Yoffie has taught an MBA course on strategy in high technology industries. More than10 of his papers have each been cited over 100 times.

In his research and consulting work, Yoffie focuses on competitive strategy, platform strategies, technology, and international competition. He served on the board of directors of numerous companies, including 29 years on Intel's board and more than 25 years on the board of the National Bureau of Economic Research. His writings on business strategy and technology have been widely published. Yoffie is the author or editor of 10 books, including "The Business of Platforms (Harper Business 2019) and Strategy Rules (Harper Business 2015). His book Competing on Internet Time: Lessons from Netscape and Its Battle with Microsoft (1998), co-authored with MIT Professor Michael Cusumano, was named one of the top 10 business books of 1998 by Business Week and Amazon.com. He has written for The New York Times, The Wall Street Journal, and the Harvard Business Review, as well as many scholarly and managerial journals. He has also published more than 200 case studies, which have sold more than 4,000,000 copies.

Yoffie has featured among the top 40 case authors consistently, since the list was first published in 2016 by The Case Centre. He ranked third in 2018/19 and 2017/18, fourth in 2016/17 and fifth in 2015/16.

== Selected books ==
- The Business of Platforms: Competing in the Age of Digital Competition, Innovation and Power, co-authored with Michael Cusumano and Annabelle Gawer, New York: Harper Business Press, 2019. (This book is being translated into 6 languages.)
- Strategy Rules: 5 Timeless Lessons from Bill Gates, Andy Grove, and Steve Jobs, co-authored with Michael Cusumano, New York: Harper Business Press, 2015. (This book is being translated into 18 languages.)
- Judo Strategy: Turning Your Competitors’ Strength To Your Advantage, co-authored with Mary Kwak, Boston, MA: Harvard Business School Press, 2001. (This book has been translated into 10 languages.)
- Competing on Internet Time: Lessons from Netscape and its Battle with Microsoft, co-authored with Michael A. Cusumano, New York: The Free Press, 1998. (Named one of the top 10 Business Books of 1998 by BusinessWeek and Amazon.com, and translated into 3 languages.) (Abridgement of Appendix One, “Netscape’s Chronology” reprinted in Internet Business Models and Strategies: Text and Cases, Allan Afuah and Christopher L. Tucci, NY: Irwin/McGraw-Hill, 2001.) Abstract
- Competing in the Age of Digital Convergence, ed., Boston, MA: Harvard Business School Press, 1997.
- International Trade and Competition: Cases and Notes in Strategy and Management, second edition, with Benjamin Gomes-Casseres, New York, NY: McGraw-Hill, 1994. (Accompanied by International Trade and Competition Instructor's Manual.)
- Strategic Management in Information Technology Casebook, Englewood Cliffs, New Jersey: Prentice-Hall, Inc., 1994. (Accompanied by Strategic Management in Information Technology Instructor's Manual and Teaching Notes.)
- Beyond Free Trade: Firms, Governments, and Global Competition, ed., Boston, MA: Harvard Business School Press, 1993. Review
- The International Political Economy of Direct Foreign Investment (Vol. I & Vol. II), edited with Benjamin Gomes-Casseres, London, England: Edward Elgar Publishing Limited, 1993.

== Selected articles ==
- Yoffie, David B. and Michael A. Cusumano and Annabelle Gawer, "The Future of Platforms," Special Issue on Disruption 2020, MIT Sloan Management Review, Spring 2020, Vol. 61, No. 3, pp. 46–54.
- Yoffie, David B. and Annabelle Gawer and Michael A. Cusumano, "A Study of More Than 250 Platforms Reveals Why Most Fail," Harvard Business Review, Online, May 29, 2019.
- Yoffie, David B. and Andrei Hagiu, "Network Effects," The Palgrave Encyclopedia of Strategic Management, edited by Mie Augier and David J. Teece, Palgrave Macmillan, 2016.
- Yoffie, David B. and Andrei Hagiu, "The New Patent Intermediaries: Platforms, Defensive Aggregators, and Super-Aggregators," with Andrei Hagiu, Journal of Economic Perspectives, (Winter 2013), 27, No. 1, pp. 45–66.
- Yoffie, David B. and Andrei Hagiu, "What’s Your Google Strategy?," Harvard Business Review, April 2009, 87, no. 4, pp. 74–81.
- Casadesus-Masanell, Ramon, and David B. Yoffie. "Wintel: Cooperation and Conflict." Management Science 53, no. 4 (April 2007): pp. 584–598.
- Yoffie, David B., and Mary Kwak. "Mastering Balance: How to Meet and Beat a Stronger Opponent." California Management Review 44, no. 2 (winter 2002): 8-24.
- Yoffie, David B., and Mary Kwak. "Mastering Strategic Movement at Palm." MIT Sloan Management Review 43, no. 1 (fall 2001): 55–63. (Reprint 4315.)
- Yoffie, David B., and Mary Kwak. "Playing by the Rules: How Intel Avoids Antitrust Litigation." Harvard Business Review 79, no. 6 (June 2001): 119–122. (Reprint R0106H.)
