= Gyro Motor Company =

American aircraft engine manufacturer

- Founded: 1909
- Successor: Gyro Company (1917)
- Headquarters: 774 Girard St NW Washington, D.C., 20001
- Key people: Emile Berliner, Joseph Sanders

Gyro Motor Company was an American aircraft engine manufacturer.

== History ==
In 1901, inventor Emile Berliner (1851–1929) began building experimental helicopters that used Addams-Farwell rotary engine.

The Gyro Motor Company was formed in 1909 by Emile Berliner to make rotary engines. His designs were improvements of the Addams-Farwell rotary engine Berliner used in early helicopter experiments. The engines at the time of his 1901 experiments generated just one horsepower per 20 pounds of weight. Addams-Farwell built a custom engine that weighed three to four pounds per hp. Berliner donated the engine to the National Air and Space Museum, and pursued his own advanced version. He built a small factory on 774 Girard Street in Washington, D.C., next to another small factory for his Victor record players. Gyro incorporated with $100,000 in stock in 1911. It produced 3-, 5- and 7-cylinder models of the rotary engine, each with the same bore and stroke. His engines had a 40-pound cast nickel-steel cylinder assembly that was machined down to 6 1/2 pounds with spiraling cooling fins for strength. Emile experimented with graphite powder suspended in the fuel as a method of light-weight lubrication. A monoplane built by the Washington Aeroplane Company set an American endurance record with a Gyro Seven cylinder engine of 4 hours and 23 minutes in the air.

In December 1912, Berliner traveled to Germany and set up a German manufacturing component in Adlershof to market the Gyro engines with a $500,000 capitalization. In London, pilot Beatty demonstrated a Wright aircraft retrofitted with a 50-hp Gyro engine. The Gyro progressed to 80-hp in the seven-cylinder model by 1913, and up to 110 hp in the Model L nine cylinder "Duplex" with a unique cam-driven exhaust valve. The French Gnome Omega and future variants proved to be more popular in sales. Motorenfabrik Oberursel developed its own rotary from the Gnome Monosoupape that would power many World War I fighters. In June 1914, Berliner's nephew, Joseph Sanders, became the general manager. Sanders purchased the assets in May 1917, forming the Gyro Company. Gyro motor production ended during World War I, when a flood of advanced designs were introduced to the market.

== Engines ==
Summary of aircraft built by Gyro Motor Company
Model name	First run	Number built	Type
Gyro Motor Three Cylinder	1907	1+	Three cylinder 22 hp rotary
Gyro Motor Five Cylinder	1907	1+	Five cylinder 35 hp rotary
Gyro Motor Seven Cylinder	1907	2+	Seven cylinder 50 hp - 80 hp rotary
Gyro Motor Duplex Model J	1914	1+	Five cylinder 50 hp
Gyro Motor Duplex Model K	1914	1+	Seven cylinder 90 hp
Gyro Motor Duplex Model L	1914	1+	Nine cylinder 110 hp

== See also ==
- Gnome et Rhône
