= Emile Berliner =

German-born American inventor (1851–1929)

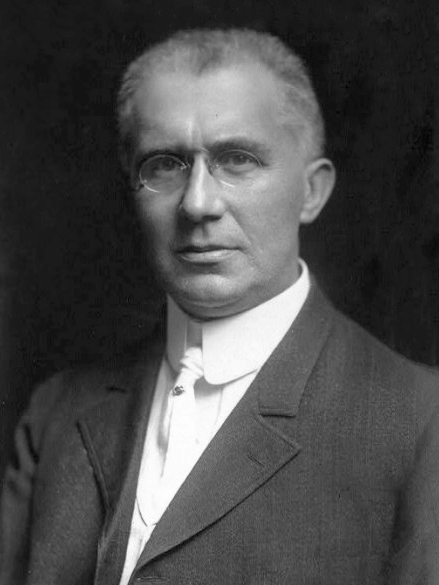
- Born: May 20, 1851; Hanover, Kingdom of Hanover
- Died: August 3, 1929 (aged 78); Washington, D.C., U.S.
- Resting place: Rock Creek Cemetery; Washington, D.C., U.S.
- Education: Cooper Union Institute
- Occupation: Inventor
- Known for: Disc record, microphone
- Spouse: Cora Adler (m. 1881–1929)
- Children: 7 including Henry Berliner
- Awards: Elliott Cresson Medal (1913)

Emile Berliner (born Emil Berliner; May 20, 1851 – August 3, 1929) was a German-American inventor and businessman who invented the lateral-cut flat disc record, also known as a "gramophone record," used with a gramophone. He founded the United States Gramophone Company in 1894.

== Early life ==
Berliner was born in Hanover, Germany, in 1851 into a Jewish merchant family. He completed an apprenticeship to become a merchant, as was family tradition. While his real hobby was invention, he worked as an accountant to make ends meet. To avoid being drafted in the Franco-Prussian War, Berliner migrated to the United States of America in 1870 with a friend of his father's, in whose shop he worked in Washington, D.C. He moved to New York and, living off temporary work such as a paper route and cleaning bottles, he studied physics at night at the Cooper Union Institute.

== Career ==
After some time working in a livery stable, Berliner became interested in the new audio technology of the telephone and phonograph. He invented an improved telephone transmitter, one of the first types of microphones. The patent was acquired by the Bell Telephone Company (see The Telephone Cases), but contested, in a long legal battle, by Thomas Edison. On February 27, 1901, the United States Court of Appeals would declare Berliner's patent void and awarded Edison full rights to the invention. "Edison preceded Berliner in the transmission of speech," the court would write. "The use of carbon in a transmitter is, beyond controversy, the invention of Edison".

Berliner moved to Boston in 1877, where he became a United States citizen four years later. He worked for Bell Telephone until 1883, when he returned to Washington and established himself as a private researcher.

=== Gramophone ===
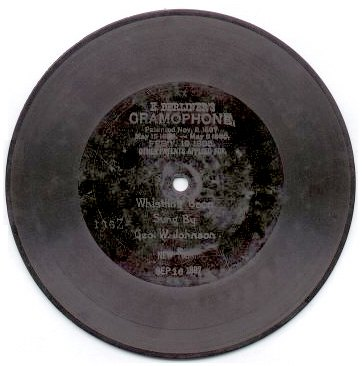
1897 Berliner Gramophone record

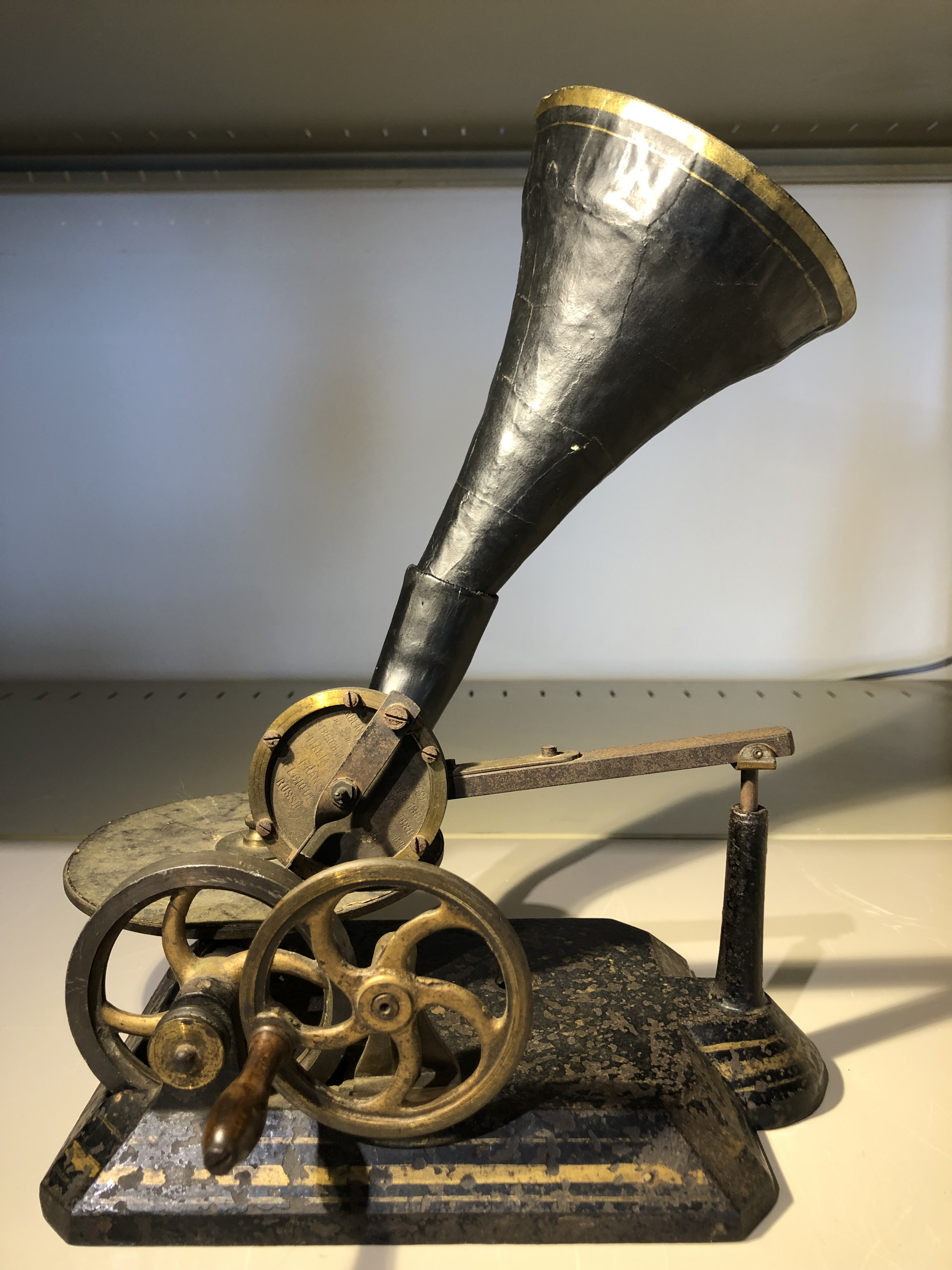
E. Berliner Toy Gramophone, 1889 (collection Musée des ondes Emile Berliner, Montreal)

In 1890, a Berliner licensee in Germany was manufacturing a toy Gramophone and five-inch hard rubber discs (stamped-out replicas of etched zinc master discs), but because key U.S. patents were still pending they were sold only in Europe. Berliner meant his Gramophone to be more than a mere toy, and in 1894 he persuaded a group of businessmen to invest $25,000, with which he started the United States Gramophone Company.

=== Rotary engine and helicopters ===
Berliner also developed a rotary engine and an early version of the helicopter. According to a July 1, 1909, report in The New York Times, a helicopter built by Berliner and J. Newton Williams of Derby, Connecticut, had Williams "from the ground on three occasions" at Berliner's laboratory in the Brightwood neighborhood of Washington, D.C.

Between 1907 and 1926, Berliner worked on technologies for vertical flight, including a lightweight rotary engine. Berliner obtained automobile engines from the Adams Company in Dubuque, Iowa, whose Adams-Farwell automobile used air-cooled three- or five-cylinder rotary engines developed in-house by Fay Oliver Farwell (1859–1935). Berliner, his assistant R.S. Moore, and Farwell developed a 36-hp rotary engine for use in helicopters, an innovation on the heavier inline engines then in use.

In 1909, Berliner founded the Gyro Motor Company in Washington, D.C. The company's principals included Berliner, president; Moore, designer and engineer; and Joseph Sanders (1877–1944), inventor, engineer, and manufacturer. The manager of the company was Spencer Heath (1876–1963), a mechanical engineer who was connected with the American Propeller Manufacturing Company, a manufacturer of aeronautical related mechanisms and products in Baltimore. By 1910, Berliner was experimenting with the use of a vertically mounted tail rotor to counteract torque on his single-main-rotor design, a configuration that led to practical helicopters of the 1940s. The building used for these operations exists at 774 Girard Street NW, Washington, D.C., where its principal facade is in the Fairmont-Girard alleyway. On June 16, 1922, Berliner and his son, Henry, demonstrated a helicopter for the US Navy's Bureau of Aeronautics.

Henry became disillusioned with helicopters in 1925, and the company shut down. In 1926, Henry Berliner founded the Berliner Aircraft Company, which merged to become Berliner-Joyce Aircraft in 1929.

=== Other ===
Berliner's other inventions include a new type of loom for mass-production of cloth and an acoustic tile.

Berliner, who suffered a nervous breakdown in 1914, also advocated for improvements in public health and sanitation. He also advocated for women's equality and, in 1908, established a scholarship program, the Sarah Berliner Research Fellowship, in honor of his mother.

== Death ==
On August 3, 1929, Berliner died of a heart attack at his home at the Wardman Park Hotel in Washington, D.C., at the age of 78. He is buried in Rock Creek Cemetery in Washington, D.C., alongside his wife and a son, Herbert Samuel Berliner.

== Publications ==
=== Books ===
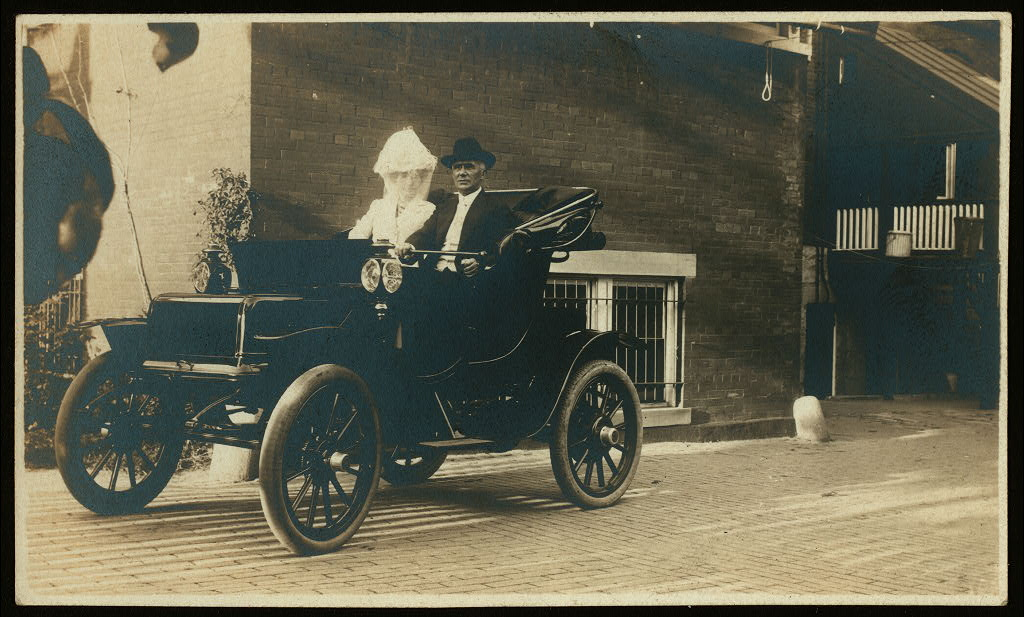
Emile Berliner with a veiled woman

- Conclusions. New York: Kaufman Pub. Co. 1902. OCLC 875135708. ISBN 978-0-8370-2292-5
- The Milk Question and Mortality among Children Here and in Germany. Society for Prevention of Sickness. 1904. OCLC 1176430061.
- Some Neglected Essentials in the Fight against Consumption. Washington, D.C.: Society for the Prevention of Sickness. 1907. OCLC 786335332 – via Harvard Library Viewer.
- A Study Towards the Solution of Industrial Problems in the New Zionist Commonwealth (PDF). Washington, D.C.: N. Peters. 1919. OCLC 3713791 – via Hebrew Union College Libraries.
- Muddy Jim and Other Rhymes: 12 Illustrated Health Jingles for Children. Jim Publication Company. 1919. See also OCLC 184990307.

=== Patents ===
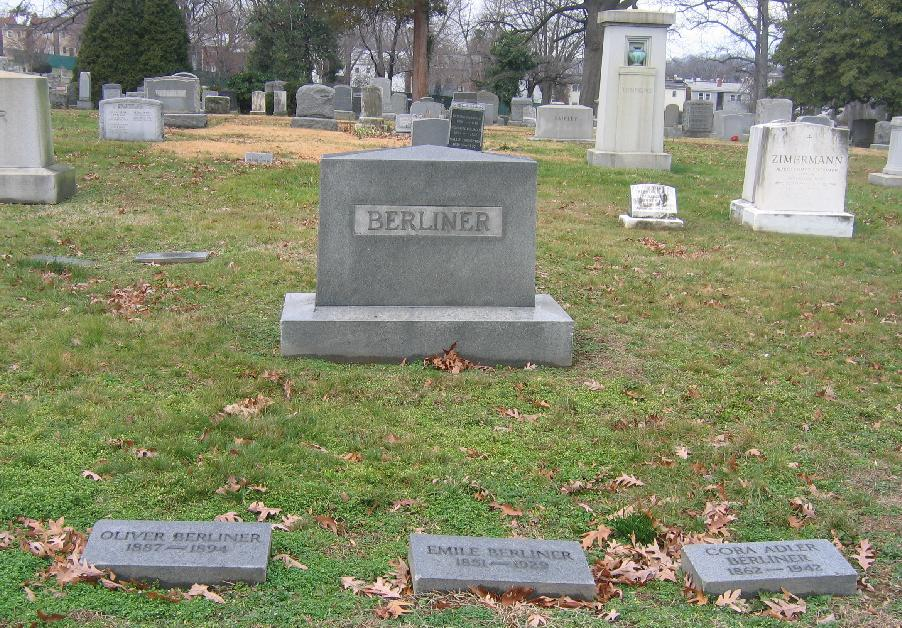
Marker for the Berliner family in Rock Creek Cemetery, Washington, D.C.

Patent images in Tag Image File Format

- U.S. patent 199,141 Telephone (induction coils), filed October 1877, issued January 1878
- U.S. patent 222,652 Telephone (carbon diaphragm microphone), filed August 1879, issued December 1879
- U.S. patent 224,573 Microphone (loose carbon rod), filed September 1879, issued February 1880
- U.S. patent 225,790 Microphone (spring carbon rod), filed Nov 1879, issued March 1880
- UK Patent 15232 filed November 8, 1887
- U.S. patent 372,786 Gramophone (horizontal recording), original filed May 1887, refiled September 1887, issued November 8, 1887
- U.S. patent 382,790 Process of Producing Records of Sound (recorded on a thin wax coating over metal or glass surface, subsequently chemically etched), filed March 1888, issued May 1888
- U.S. patent 463,569 Combined Telegraph and Telephone (microphone), filed June 1877, issued November 1891
- U.S. patent 548,623 Sound Record and Method of Making Same (duplicate copies of flat, zinc disks by electroplating), filed March 1893, issued October 1895
- U.S. patent 564,586 Gramophone (recorded on underside of flat, transparent disk), filed November 7, 1887, issued July 1896
