= Fay Oliver Farwell =

Fayette Oliver Farwell (December 1858 – 24 May 1935), co-creator of the Adams-Farwell automobile manufacturing company, was a prolific American inventor with at least thirteen patents credited to his name.

== Patents ==
- camp chair ........................October 10, 1887
- camp chair support ...............July 14, 1890
- cash carrier ........................March 10, 1891
- stove back ........................March 23, 1892
- stove damper .....................April 27, 1892
- combined anvil and vise.........April 5, 1894
- non-conducting handle.........June 7, 1894
- stovepipe damper...............August 21, 1894
- molding machine...............September 16, 1895
- front grate........................October 25, 1895
- oven shelf........................November 4, 1895
- milling machine..................February 25, 1896
- sand press........................August 28, 1897
- current controller/igniting devices for hydrocarbon engines........ October 21, 1904
- lubricator........................November 17, 1904
- milling machine...............December 9, 1908
- molding machine...............November 4, 1910
- internal combustion motor ...February 28, 1911
- gear-hobbing machine.........June 10, 1911
- driving mechanism for machine spindles............January 23, 1919

Lesser known was Farwell's development of a timing device that allowed machine gun bullets to be fired through the whirling propellers of airplanes without striking the blades. Near the time of World War I, Farwell was called to Washington, D.C. by the War Department to further refine his ideas. Farwell left Dubuque in 1921 to demonstrate a merry-go-round he had patented. He sold a phonograph invention to the Victor Talking Machine Company. He returned to the gear-cutting business in Toledo. Three sons-Jay, Ray, and Fay survived him.
