= Giuseppe Albanese =

Italian pianist

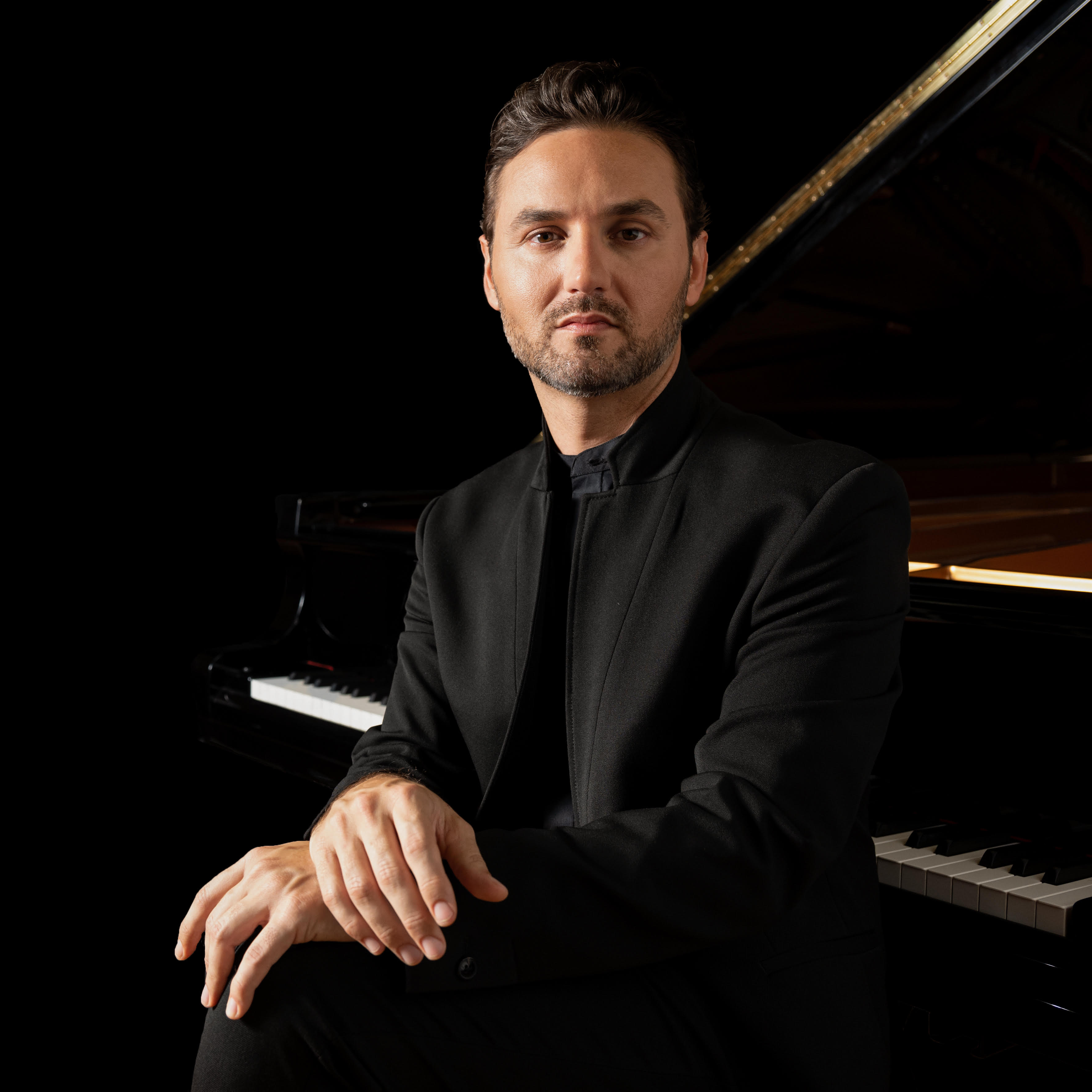

Background information
- Born: 11 May 1979 (age 46); Reggio Calabria, Italy
- Genres: Classical
- Occupation: Pianist
- Instrument: Piano
- Label: Deutsche Grammophon/Universal

Giuseppe Albanese (born in Reggio Calabria; 11 May 1979) is an Italian pianist.

== Early years ==
Albanese studied at Imola International Piano Academy and at Messina University, where he was awarded a Magna cum laude Doctorate in Philosophy, writing his thesis on the aesthetics of Liszt in his Années de pèlerinage. At age of 25, Giuseppe became a full professor, teaching Methodology of Musical Communication at the University of Messina.

== Career ==
He launched his career winning First Prize at the Vendome International Piano Competition in London, with a distinguished jury chaired by Sir Jeffrey Tate, Stephen Bishop-Kovacevich, Elisabeth Leonskaja, Elisabeth Söderström, Christa Ludwig, defined by Le Figaro as “the piano world’s most prestigious award". Albanese was awarded First Prize at Premio Venezia, the most important Italian piano competition.

His concerts are regularly broadcast by RAI Italian national radio and television, and Classical HD recently broadcast his Debussy program performed in Teatro Bibiena in Mantova.

=== Piano competitions ===
- 1997: First Prize at Premio Venezia competition (President of the jury: Roman Vlad);
- 2003: "Special prize for the best piano contemporary execution" at Ferruccio Busoni International Piano Competition
- 2003: First Prize at Vendome Prize international competition (President of the jury: Jeffrey Tate).

== Recordings ==
In 2018, Universal released his recording of Liszt's Piano Concertos 1 & 2 and Malédiction with the “Russian Philharmonic”.

In 2020 Albanese released his third DG album “Invitation to the dance”, featuring works by Weber, Delibes, Tchaikovsky, Stravinsky, Debussy and Ravel.

=== Discography ===
- 1998: Premio Venezia: Recital of the "Premio Venezia" winner;
- 1999: Luciano Simoni: Europe Piano Concerto Op. 50 for piano and orchestra (Agorà/Delta Dischi);
- 2000: 1900: Recital with music by Bartok, Mac Dowell, Szymanowski and Scrjabin (QuadroFrame);
- 2004: En plen air: Recital of the "Vendome Prize" winner (produced by Jerusalem Music Center);
- 2012: Pour le piano: Monograph on Claude Debussy, Albanese;
- 2014: Fantasia, Albanese – (Deutsche Grammophon);
- 2015: Liszt – Après une lecture de Liszt, Albanese – (Deutsche Grammophon);
- 2016: Bartók’s “Valtozatok” BB 64 in “Bartók complete works” (Decca Classics);
- 2017: Liszt Piano Concertos Nos. 1&2 and Malédiction, Albanese (Universal Music Group);
- 2020: Invitation to the dance, Albanese – (Deutsche Grammophon);
