= Vincenzina Cusmano =

Venerable Vincenzina Cusmano S.d.P.
- Born: 6 January 1826; Palermo, Kingdom of the Two Sicilies
- Died: 2 February 1894 (aged 68); Palermo, Kingdom of Italy
- Venerated in: Roman Catholic Church
- Attributes: Religious habit

Vincenzina Cusmano (6 January 1826 - 2 February 1894) was an Italian Roman Catholic professed religious from the Sisters Servants of the Poor. Her brother was Giacomo Cusmano; she joined his religious congregation as the two tended to the poor in Palermo. Her original intention was to become a cloistered Carmelite nun though was forced to abandon this desire after her mother died; her mother's death during an epidemic meant that she had to assume care for her siblings since she was the eldest one. Cusmano tended to the poor in Palermo and often worked alongside her brother in this venture until his death in 1888; she continued his work as the Superior General for her order until her own death.

Her cause for beatification launched in the late 1990s in the Palermo archdiocese and she became titled as a Servant of God. Pope Francis confirmed her heroic virtue in mid-2017 and named her as Venerable.

== Life ==
Vincenzina Cusmano was born in Palermo in the Kingdom of the Two Sicilies on 6 January 1826 as the first of five children to Giacomo Cusmano and Maddalena Patti. The Cusmano's lived in the Albergheria which was one of the oldest neighborhoods in Palermo. Her siblings (in order) were:

- Pietro
- Giuseppina
- Giacomo - (15.3.1834-14.3.1888) - priest; beatified on 30 October 1983.
- Giuseppe

Her mother died during a cholera epidemic and this forced her to assume care for her siblings since she was the eldest and her father was unable to provide for all their needs on his own. Cusmano studied literature and music at home as was the norm for that time while her spiritual director was Fr. Domenico Turano (the future Bishop of Agrigento). Her timid and reserved nature contributed to her intense desire for deeper contemplation and turned one of the rooms in her home into a small chapel that she could often be found in; she dreamt of becoming a cloistered Carmelite nun despite her extensive domestic duties that wound up preventing her from entering a convent.

Cusmano maintained a deep connection to her priest brother Giacomo and the two together tended to the poor in the streets of the poorer neighborhoods. Her consistent encouragement for his pastoral mission led Giacomo to consider founding a religious congregation dedicating to ministering to the poor in 1878. The Sisters Servants of the Poor was founded on 23 May 1880 and she and five others received the religious habit from her brother; she also was the first Superior General for the order until her death. Cusmano was a prominent figure in her order since she helped to direct their charitable initiatives and their wider apostolate; she was noted for having been like a mother or sister to some of her peers.

Her brother Giacomo died in 1888 and this left her alone to manage the order and its apostolate alone. Cusmano later died on 2 February 1894 in Palermo.

== Beatification process ==
The beatification process launched on 19 November 1996 after the Congregation for the Causes of Saints provided its assent (issuing a "nihil obstat" decree) to the cause and named her as a Servant of God. The diocesan investigation was conducted in the Palermo archdiocese with Cardinal Salvatore De Giorgi inaugurating it on 27 January 1997 and later closing it on 12 December 2001; the C.C.S. in Rome validated this process on 15 May 2003.

The postulation (the officials coordinating the cause) submitted the official Positio dossier to the C.C.S. for assessment in 2005. Historical consultants met and approved the cause not long after on 15 March 2005. Theologians confirmed their approval at a meeting around a decade later while the C.C.S. cardinal and bishop members approved the cause as well on 2 May 2017. Cusmano became titled as Venerable on 4 May 2017 after Pope Francis signed a decree that acknowledged that Cusmano had practiced heroic virtue throughout her life.

The current postulator for this cause is Archbishop Vincenzo Bertolone.
