= Adams Company =

Defunct American motor vehicle manufacturer

The Adams Company is an American manufacturing concern. It was founded in 1883 and is based in Dubuque, Iowa, United States.

Between 1905 and 1912 it produced the Adams-Farwell, a brass era automobile.

== History ==
The Roberts & Langworthy Iron Works, located at 57 South Main Street in Dubuque, were manufacturers of "fine light castings" like grave crosses and park benches. Eugene Adams invested in the company in June 1883 when Roberts decided to retire, and Adams took the position of a secretary and manager. A change of the company name to Langworthy and Adams Iron Works followed in 1885. When Langworthy retired in 1892, Eugene's brother Herbert bought his share and the company was re-organized as The Adams Company, a foundry and machine shop. The plant burnt down the same year in a disastrous fire, and the company opened new facilities at East Fourth Street. Now, machine castings and household devices like a patented floor heating vent with inner rotating portion that distributed warm air in upper level rooms, or laundry stoves were added. In 1895, Fay Oliver Farwell (1859–1935) became manager of the company.

=== The Adams-Farwell automobile ===
About 1895, Farwell began experimenting with an internal combustion engined automobile, for which he conceived a horizontally mounted rotary engine with three cylinders. The vertically standing crank shaft was fixed in the chassis. Farwell felt this configuration was lighter than conventional engines as it used neither a flywheel — since the spinning engine crankcase and cylinders acted as their own flywheel when running — nor radiator, because of its air cooled design. Farwell completed the first prototype in 1898. Basically a horse-drawn carriage, he mounted his engine between the front wheels. This proved impractical, so his second car, appropriately named number 2, had the engine installed in the rear as all Adams-Farwells would thereafter. This car used bicycle wheels; the next had wooden artillery wheels. Little is known about car number 4, which probably was similar to number 3, and which was sold to a Dubuque resident. Number 5 was shown at the Chicago Auto Show in February 1905. Now, first orders were taken. With only minor modifications, the car went into - very limited - production as the Model 6 20/25 hp. Referring to its engine, Adams-Farwell frequently used the slogan: It spins like a top.

An Automobile Quarterly article credits Mr. Farwell's inspiration for his rotary radial engine to have been a steam winch he had witnessed in operation in the late 19th century. Also mentioned in the cited article is the participation of an Adams-Farwell automobile in the first automobile race in America, but that is refuted by the following citation:

==== Innovations ====
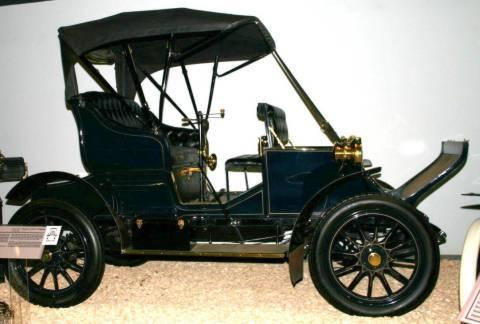
This Adams-Farwell Series 6 40/45 hp touring car with a 5-cylinder engine of 490.9 cu in (8,044 cc) and coachwork by Connolly Carriage & Buggy Co. (1906) is the only known Adams-Farwell in existence. It can be driven either from the front or rear bench seat.

Adams-Farwell automobiles had further unique details. The only available coachwork, called a Convertible Brougham, was in fact a Town brougham, and the "convertible" part was not the top but driver's position. His bench seat in the front of the car was retractable and could fold away in inclement weather, thus forming a splash board. Then, the tiller and driving devices could easily be relocated in front of the rear seat, under the fixed top. These cars could even be started from the driver's seat as they provided a lever that had to be pulled up instead of the usual crank. This car was listed at US$2500, placing it in the lower luxury car field. It is this concept that leads to the claim that Adams-Farwell automobiles were among the first automobiles that could be driven year-round.

For 1906, Model 6 became Series 6. A new Series 6 40/45 hp with a 490.9 cu in (8,044 cc) five cylinder rotary was added. The car got a somewhat longer wheelbase, and a Landaulet body style replaced the Brougham, probably very similar but with a convertible rear part of the top. New to the line was a touring car, frequently called a Convertible Runabout. Both body styles were 5-seaters.

Three more cars were offered with the 40/45 hp engine only. One was an Extension Brougham with a longer wheelbase, the other, the Model 7-A, was a 7-passenger touring with a conventional looking front; the engine still was in the rear. The rear seat was slightly moved forward. While standard wheelbase was 90 in (2,300 mm), the Extension Brougham's was 94 in (2,400 mm), and the 7-A's 108 in (2,700 mm). All got the retractable front seat bench and the unique steering system. The third new car was different. Called the Model 8-A Gentleman's Speed Roadster, it had the shortest chassis with 86 in (2,200 mm), and the larger engine. Instead of using the familiar frame with a separate body, it had no chassis at all, anticipating later unibody constructions. This sports car was very fast for the time with a top speed of around 75 mph (121 km/h).

The only remaining Adams-Farwell automobile shows a tag by the Connolly Carriage & Buggy Co. It seems this company, not only reputed for quality carriages and coachwork, also built the chassis for the Adams-Farwell. As period advertisements indicate complete cars were offered, there is some evidence they might have built the bulk of the Adam-Farwell bodies.

For 1907, most models were gone, and Adams-Farwell offered only an improved Model 7-A Touring, now with an even longer wheelbase and a higher price.

Farwell had more ideas to offer. For 1908, a new Model 9 50 hp appeared. It seems this the first Adams-Farwell with a new and ingenious four speed transmission. Since most contemporary cars had three speeds, the new Adams-Farwell offered an ingenious construction consisting of the transmission, two clutches, a lever for each of them, and one handle to operate the levers. One clutch engaged gears 2 and 4, the other gears 1, 3, and reverse. So, two speeds could be "preselected", but the one-handle operation prevented two speeds being engaged at the same time. Further, antiquated tiller steering was replaced by a wheel, and there was a pedal for acceleration. Therefore, the removable steering was no longer offered, but Adams-Farwells got a rail instead in which the column and pedal could be moved from the left to the right, allowing the driver to sit either at the left, the right or in the center. Model 9 came as 7-passenger touring, a 3-passenger coupé, and 3-passenger roadster, the latter replacing the Model 8-A, featuring normal chassis and body construction.

A final change came for 1909. The coupé was dropped, the roadster got one more seat, and the touring became even longer. Adam-Farwells were offered until 1912 (or 1913, depending on source) in this lineup. Then, production of automobiles ceased after just about 200 cars built. Usually, 25 cars per year left the factory, with 52-54 in 1910. A few of them went to the Dubuque Police Department.

==== Adam-Farwell models ====
The small company brought out a large number of models, solving some contemporary problems of driving:

| Model year | Model | Number of cylinders | Power | Wheelbase mm / in. | Coachwork | List price |
|---|---|---|---|---|---|---|
| 1898 | Model No. 1 | 3 rotary | | | Express carriage | - |
| around 1899 | Model No. 2 | 3 rotary | | | | - |
| 1901 | Model No. 3 | 3 rotary | | | | - |
| around 1902 | Model No. 4 | 3 rotary | | | | |
| 1904–1905 | Model No. 5 | 3, rotary | 25 hp | | Convertible Brougham | - |
| 1905 | Model No. 6 20/25 hp | 3 rotary | 25 hp | 2134 / 84 | Convertible Brougham | $2500 |
| 1906 | Series 6 20/25 hp Model A | 3 rotary | 25 hp | 2286 / 90 | 5-passenger Touring | $2000 |
| 1906 | Series 6 20/25 hp Model B | 3 rotary | 25 hp | 2286 / 90 | 7-passenger Landaulet | $2500 |
| 1906 | Series 6 40/45 hp | 5 rotary | 45 hp | 2286 / 90 | 5-passenger Touring | $2500 |
| 1906 | Series 6 40/45 hp | 5 rotary | 45 hp | 2286 / 90 | 7-passenger Landaulet | $3000 |
| 1906 | Series 6 40/45 hp | 5 rotary | 45 hp | 2388 / 94 | Extension Brougham | $4000 |
| 1906 | Model 7-A 40/45 hp | 5 rotary | 45 hp | 2743 / 108 | 7-passenger Touring | $3000 |
| 1906 | Model 8-A 40/45 hp | 5 rotary | 45 hp | 2184 / 86 | Gentleman's Speed Roadster | $4000 |
| 1907 | Model 7-A 40/45 hp | 5 rotary | 45 hp | 3048 / 120 | 7-passenger Touring | $3250 |
| 1908 | Model 9 50 hp | 5 rotary | 50 hp | 3048 / 120 | 3-passenger Roadster | $3000 |
| 1908 | Model 9 50 hp | 5 rotary | 50 hp | 3048 / 120 | 7-pass. Touring | $3500 |
| 1908 | Model 9 50 hp | 5 rotary | 50 hp | 3048 / 120 | 3-passenger Coupé | $4000 |
| 1909–1912 | Model 9 50 hp | 5 rotary | 50 hp | 3048 / 120 | 4-passenger Roadster | $3000 |
| 1909–1912 | Model 9 50 hp | 5 rotary | 50 hp | 3251 / 128 | 7-passenger Touring | $3500 |

Note: Above coachwork designation is by manufacturer; they may not coincide with body designations as commonly in use.

1906 advertisements show a touring car with "fake" hood, designated Model L. It seems this is the Model 7-A 40/45 hp; there is no additional information about it, and there is no further evidence more models existed than listed above.

==== The only surviving Adams-Farwell ====
The National Automobile Museum in Reno, Nevada owns the last existing Adams-Farwell automobile, a Series 6 40/45 hp Touring Victoria coach, built by the Connolly Carriage & Buggy Company, probably of Dubuque. This car was invited to the Pebble Beach Concours d'Elegance in 2011 where it won the Charles A. Chayne Trophy for the most advanced technology of its period.

=== Post-automobile company history ===
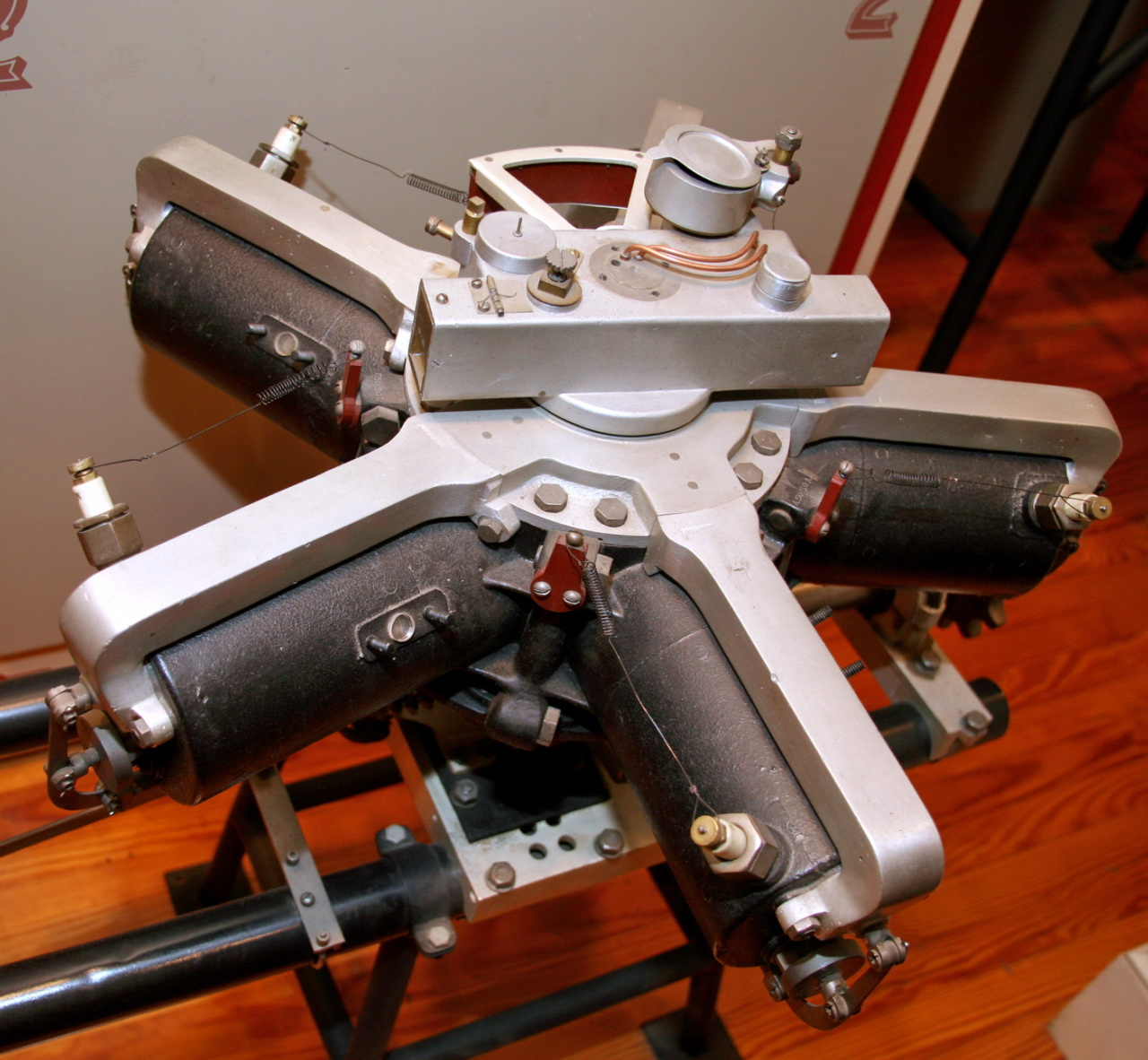
A modified 1907 Adams-Farwell engine powered three man-lifting experimental helicopters designed by Emile Berliner.

Like another builder of rotary engined road vehicles, Stephen Marius Balzer of New York City, the Adams Company offered light gyrocopter engines which successfully powered experimental flying machines by Emile Berliner in 1909–1910 and J. Newton Williams in 1909. Engine production lasted longer than automobile manufacture although it is not clear when this stopped, too. The Adams Company then relied on their iron foundry and manufactured gears, shafts and parts for power transmissions.

F. Oliver Farwell left the company in 1921. He had about 20 patents to his name and tried to build up a business on one he held for a novel transmission for merry-go-rounds. Later, he worked in a gear-cutting company in Toledo, Ohio.

As of March 2026, The Adams Company continues as a custom manufacturer of industrial gears and shafts. It is a closely-held private corporation.

== See also ==
- List of defunct United States automobile manufacturers

== Sources ==
- Clymer, Floyd. Treasury of Early American Automobiles, 1877–1925. New York: Bonanza Books, 1950. p. 55.
- Georgano, G.N. (1974). "Adams-Farwell", The Complete Encyclopedia of Motorcars 1885–1968. New York: E.P. Dutton and Co. p. 27.
- Georgano, G.N., ed. (1973). The Complete Encyclopedia of Motorcars, 1885 to the Present, 2nd edition. New York: Dutton Press. ISBN 0-525-08351-0
- Kimes, Beverly Rae (2005). Pioneers, Engineers, and Scoundrels: The Dawn of the Automobile in America. Warrendale PA: SAE (Society of Automotive Engineers) Permissions. ISBN 0-7680-1431-X; S. 368
- Kimes, Beverly Rae and Clark, Henry Austin, Jr., eds (1985). The Standard Catalogue of American Cars 1805–1942, 2nd edition. Iola WI: Krause Publications. ISBN 0-87341-111-0
