= Roberto Albanese =

Italian politician (1950–2016)

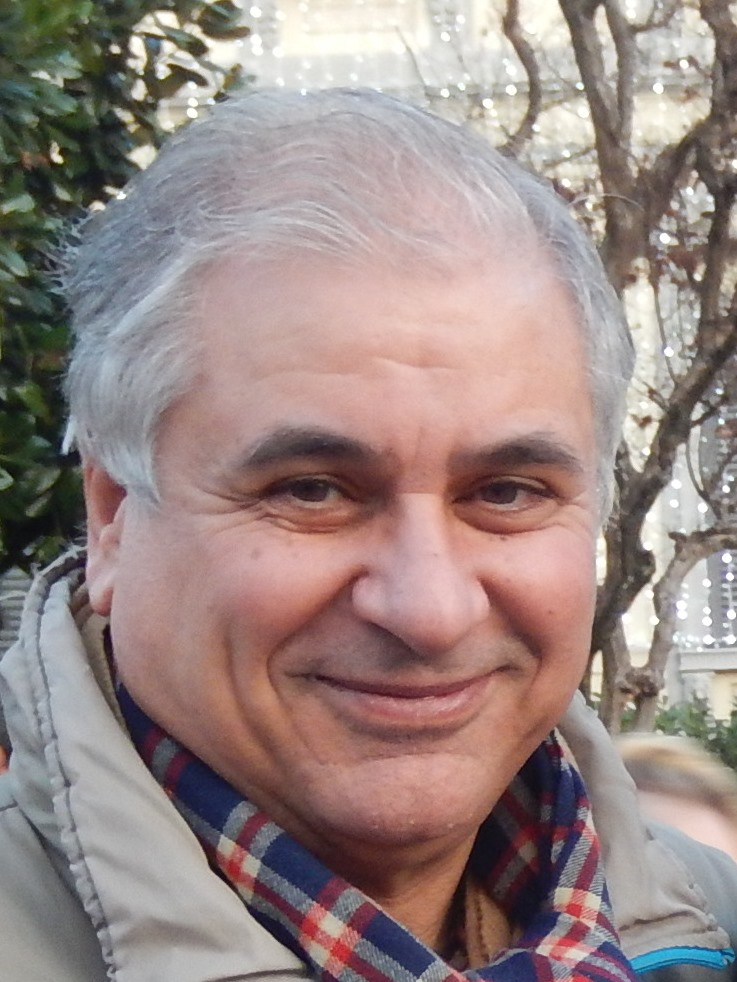
Roberto Albanese

Roberto "Nik" Albanese (November 1950 in Sovico – January 2016). He was among the founding members of the Italian Greens in 1986 and promoter of the creation of the Regional Park of the Lambro Valley (Lombardy).

Albanese was elected as regional councillor of Lombardy in 1985 and ran for the 2014 European elections and other local elections (province of Pavia and municipality of Monza) as member of the Greens.

Albanese also served as director of the Green Man Institute (Monza), spokesperson of the Greens of Monza and Brianza district, educator and essayist, he worked in many European projects to promote peace and environmental protection. Among his last commitments at the European level, he represented the Italian Greens at the 23rd European Green Party Council in Lyon on 12 November 2015 and he was a petitioner at the European Parliament to intervene in the crisis of the solar energy sector in Italy.

Albanese died in January 2016 at the age of 65.
