= Michael A. Cusumano =

American academic

Michael A. Cusumano is the Sloan Management Review Distinguished Professor and former Deputy Dean (2020-2024) at the MIT Sloan School of Management. Previously he held a joint appointment in the MIT School of Engineering, Division of Engineering Systems. Professor Cusumano specializes in strategy, product development, and entrepreneurship in computer software as well as automobiles and consumer electronics. At MIT, he has recently taught Platform Strategy & Entrepreneurship as well as Strategy & the CEO. During 2016–17, he was on leave as Special Vice President and Dean of Entrepreneurship and Innovation Initiatives at Tokyo University of Science, where he founded the Tokyo Entrepreneurship and Innovation Center and designed a new mid-career Management of Technology curriculum as well as a new business school that merged the Graduate School of Innovation and the School of Management.

Cusumano received a BA degree from Princeton University in 1976 and a PhD from Harvard University in 1984, and completed a postdoctoral fellowship in Production and Operations Management at the Harvard Business School during 1984–86. He is fluent in Japanese and has lived and worked in Japan for more than nine years, with two Fulbright Fellowships and a Japan Foundation Fellowship for studying at Tokyo University. He has been a visiting professor at Imperial College London, the University of Tokyo, Hitotsubashi University, the University of St. Gallen, the University of Maryland, and LMU Munich. He has consulted and lectured for approximately 100 organizations and is currently a director of one publicly listed company: ORIX Corporation in Japan. He is a former director of Patni Computer Systems in India (sold in 2011 for $1.2 billion) and Fixstars Solutions, a Japanese developer of high-performance software applications, as well as several other companies. He was recently a director of Multitude SE, a Fintech company based in Europe; and Zylotech, a predictive analytics company operating out of Cambridge, Massachusetts. He has served as editor-in-chief and chairman of the MIT Sloan Management Review and writes regularly on Technology Strategy and Management for Communications of the ACM. In 2009, he was named one of the most influential people in technology and IT by Silicon.com.

== Selected books ==
- The Business of Platforms: Strategy in the Age of Digital Competition, Innovation, and Power (2019, with A. Gawer and D. Yoffie)
- Strategy Rules: Five Timeless Lessons from Bill Gates, Andy Grove, and Steve Jobs (2015, with D. Yoffie)
- Staying Power: Six Enduring Principles for Managing Strategy and Innovation in an Uncertain World (Lessons from Microsoft, Apple, Intel, Google, Toyota) ... (Oxford Clarendon Lectures in Management Studies, 2010)
- Platform Leadership: How Intel, Microsoft, and Cisco Drive Industry Innovation (2002, with A. Gawer)
- Competing on Internet Time: Lessons From Netscape & Its Battle with Microsoft (1998, with D. Yoffie)
- Microsoft Secrets: How the World's Most Powerful Software Company Creates Technology, Shapes Markets, and Manages People (1995, with R. Selby)
- Japan's Software Factories: A Challenge to U.S. Management (1991)
- The Japanese Automobile Industry: Technology and Management at Nissan and Toyota (1985)
