= Antonio Albanese (fencer) =

Italian fencer (1937–2013)

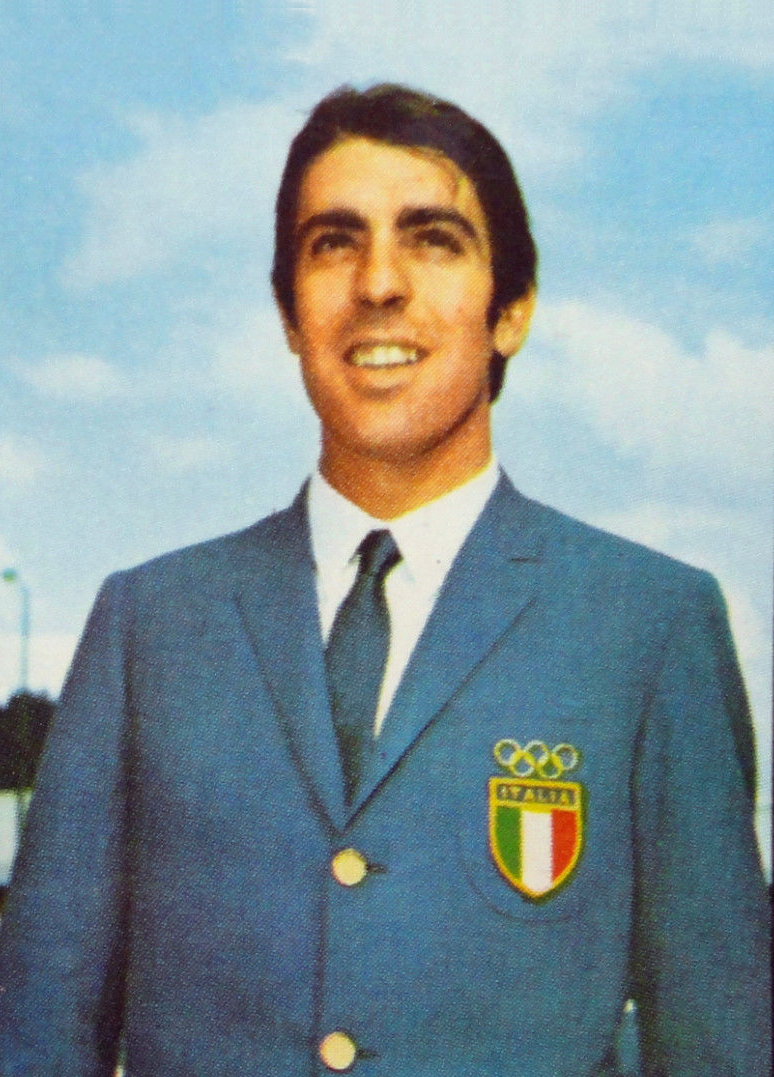
- Antonio Albanese c. 1968

Personal information
- Born: 5 December 1937 Milan, Italy
- Died: 15 June 2013 (aged 75) Bergamo, Italy
- Height: 1.76 m (5 ft 9 in)
- Weight: 76 kg (168 lb)

Sport
- Sport: Fencing

Antonio Albanese (5 December 1937 – 15 June 2013) was an Italian fencer. He competed in the team épée event at the 1968 Summer Olympics and finished in sixth place.
