= Camille Cusumano =

American novelist

Camille J. Cusumano is an American author of Sicilian descent.

Her newest book, Tango, an Argentine Love Story is a travel memoir of her living in Buenos Aires. She has written for many publications (on food, travel and fitness), including Islands, Country Living, Yoga Journal, and the AAA's on-line VIA Magazine (where she was a staff editor for 17 years), The New York Times, San Francisco Chronicle, Los Angeles Times and The Washington Post. She is the editor of Seal Press anthologies, "love stories" about France, Italy, Mexico, and Greece. She is the author of several cookbooks and one novel, The Last Cannoli, published by Legas. Her short story, Plot Theory, won third place in the 2006 Kurt Vonnegut short fiction contest and was published in the North American Review.
