= Angelo Albanesi =

Italian engraver

Angelo Albanesi (c. 1765–1784) was an Italian engraver in the late 18th century. He is known for etchings of architectural ruins in and near Rome, and a series of engravings of nymphs after Angelica Kauffman, published in London in 1784. He also engraved some portraits.
