= Thomas Albanese =

Italian footballer (born 1988)

Personal information
- Date of birth: 15 April 1988 (age 38)
- Place of birth: Varese, Italy
- Height: 1.78 m (5 ft 10 in)
- Position: Forward

Team information
- Current team: ASC San Giorgio

Senior career*
Years	Team	Apps	(Gls)
2005–2006	Tolentino	21	(?)
2006–2012	Siena	0	(0)
2007–2008	→ Ancona (loan)	4	(1)
2008–2009	→ Legnano (loan)	19	(1)
2009–2012	→ Südtirol (loan)	44	(10)
2012–2013	L'Aquila	4	(0)
2013–2014	Sansepolcro		
2014	Recanati		
2014–	ASC San Giorgio		

International career
2006–2007	Italy U19	6	(2)
2007	Italy U20	1	(0)
2008	Italy U20 Lega Pro	1	(0)
- * Club domestic league appearances and goals

Thomas Albanese (born 15 April 1988) is an Italian footballer who plays for ASC San Giorgio.

== Biography ==
Albanese started his football career with Tolentino. In July 2006, he was loaned to Serie A side Siena and played for their reserve "Primavera". Siena bought him outright in January 2007.

In July 2007, Albanese was loaned to Serie C1 club Ancona. He played four matches for the club and he also took part in the promotion playoffs. Ancona won promotion that season. In August 2008, he remained in Lega Pro Prima Divisione (formerly known as Serie C1) for Legnano.

Albanese was loaned to Lega Pro Seconda Divisione side South Tyrol for the 2009–10 season. He scored eight league goals for the Seconda Divisione Group A champion. In July 2010, his loan was renewed. He suffered an injury and only played six games in the 2010–11 season. In the following season the loan was renewed again, however Albanese only played 8 times.

On 31 August 2012 Albanese joined L'Aquila for free in 2-year contract. Albanese played 4 times in 2012–13 season. In 2013–14 season he was released.

=== International career ===
Albanese received six caps for the Italy under-19 team, but did not play in the 2007 UEFA European Under-19 Football Championship qualification matches. He also made an appearance for Italy U20 team, where he came on as a substitute for Daniele Paponi in the second half of the first match of the 2007–08 Four Nations Tournament. He also received call-up from Italy under-20 Lega Pro representative team and also represented Serie C1/B in an annual under-21 tournament against Serie C1/A, which Albanese scored one goal for the losing side in 2008 and scored one goal for the winning side in 2009 for Group A. He also played for the Lega Pro team in the 2008–09 Mirop Cup.
