= Enrico Albanese =

Italian surgeon (1834–1889)

- Born: March 11, 1834; Palermo, Italy
- Died: May 5, 1889; Naples, Italy
- Scientific career
- Fields: medicine, patriot, surgeon

Enrico Albanese (11 March 1834, in Palermo – 5 May 1889, in Naples) was an Italian surgeon who lived during the Italian Risorgimento and distinguished himself in the field of Orthopaedics and Traumatology. He earned a Medical degree in 1855 and the year after he went to Florence to finish his studies, under the guidance of M. Bufalini, G. Pellizzari and F. Zannetti. After a few years he came back to his hometown, where he attended the school of Giovanni Gorgone, a well-known Anatomy teacher and full professor of Clinical surgery at the University of Palermo. Enrico Albanese was also a close friend of Giuseppe Garibaldi, with whom he shared a lot of ideals and political aims; in fact he participated in the “Expedition of the Thousand” in 1860. He also took part in the attempt to free Rome and during the “Aspromonte battle” on 29 August 1862 he was called upon to heal a severe wound on the foot of General Garibaldi.

In 1865 he became director of the Civil Hospital of Palermo and he also founded a paediatric ward and antiseptic operating room, one of the first to follow Joseph Lister’s theories. Later in 1869 he directed the hospital gazette that became the main advertising medium of the hospital. Only after Gorgone’s death in 1868, he was called upon to take his place in the Chair of Clinical Surgery. In 1873 he committed himself to the foundation and organization of a hospital building for children, called “Ospizio Marino”, where diseases such as rickets, spondylitis and scrofula were treated. Enrico Albanese’s scientific activity was particularly intense. We can recall his studies in epidermal transplantation, blood transfusion, preventive haemostasis in surgery and also the surgical procedures that he experimented, such as Astragalectomie and shoulder resection. He died in Naples at the age of 55 on 5 May 1889 and was buried in the cemetery of Santa Maria di Gesù (Palermo). His grave is covered by a big tombstone made of a type of marble called “pietra di Caprera”, donated by Garibaldi as a sign of friendship and gratitude.

== Bibliography ==
- Enrico Albanese, Notizie di Chirurgia pratica, officio tipografico di Benedetto Lima, Palermo, 1869
