= List of Phillips Exeter Academy people =

The following is a list of notable faculty, trustees, and alumni of Phillips Exeter Academy, a preparatory school in Exeter, New Hampshire, founded in 1781.

== Founder ==
- John Phillips – founder of Phillips Exeter; president of board of trustees 1781–1795

== Principals ==
- Benjamin Abbot – principal 1788–1838
- Gideon Lane Soule – principal 1838–1873
- Albert C. Perkins – principal 1873–1883
- Walter Quincy Scott – president of Ohio State University; principal 1884–1889
- Charles Everett Fish – principal 1890–1895
- Harlan P. Amen – principal 1895–1913
- Lewis Perry – principal 1914–1946
- William Saltonstall – principal 1946–1963
- William Ernest Gillespie – Latin instructor 1939–1967, vice principal, dean of faculty, interim principal 1963–1964
- Richard W. Day – principal 1964–1973
- Stephen G. Kurtz – historian; principal 1974–1987
- Kendra Stearns O'Donnell – painter; principal 1987–1997
- Tyler Tingley – principal 1997–2009
- Thomas Hassan – faculty 1989–present; principal 2009–2015
- Lisa MacFarlane – principal 2015–2018
- William Knox Rawson – interim principal 2018, principal 2019–2026
- Jennifer Karlen Elliott - principal 2026 - present

== Notable faculty members and trustees ==
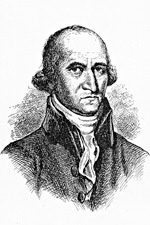
Paine Wingate

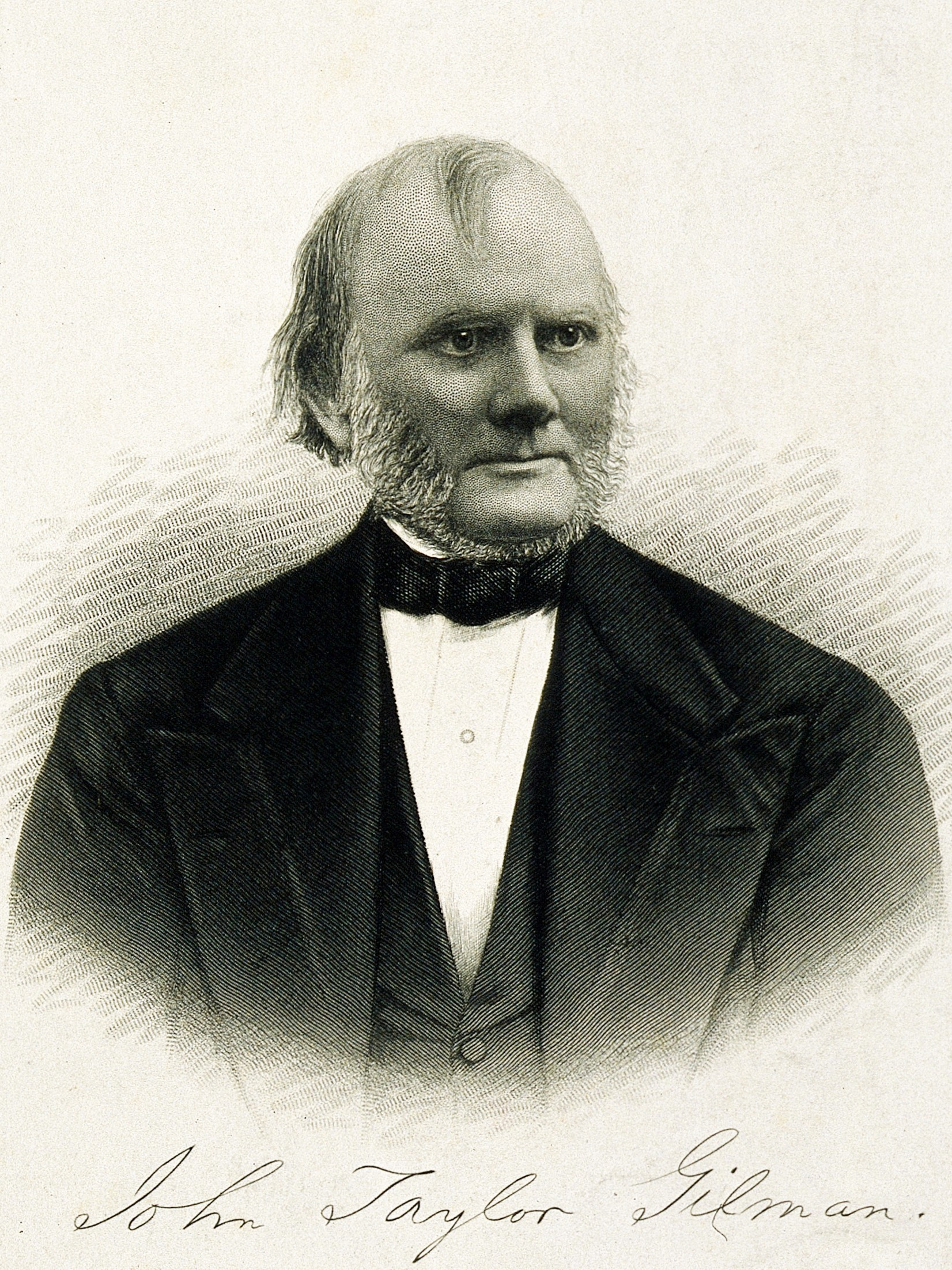
John Taylor Gilman

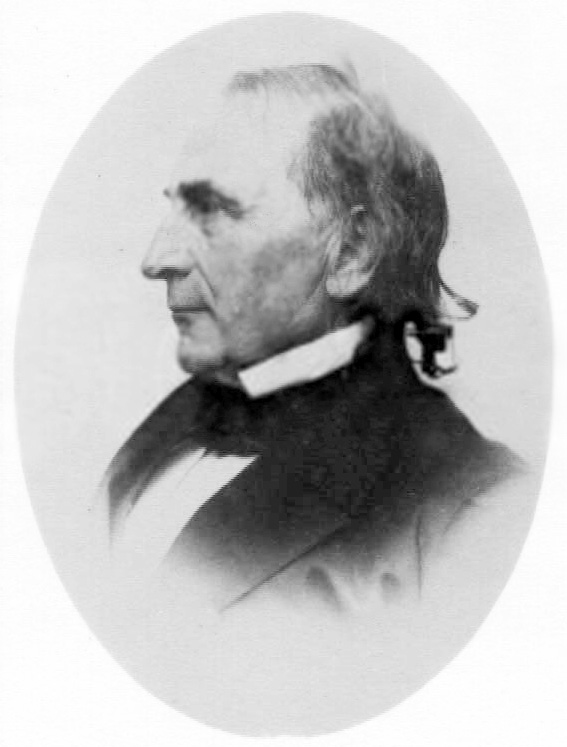
James Walker

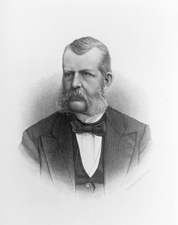
Charles H. Bell

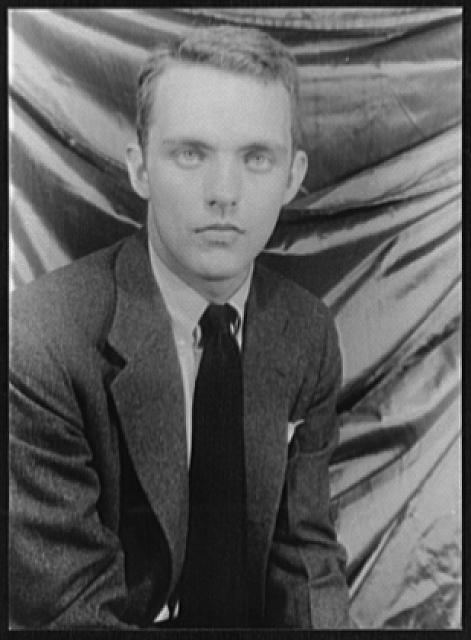
Frederick Buechner

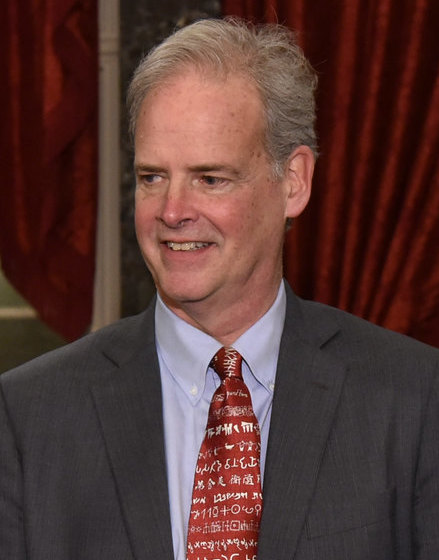
Thomas Hassan

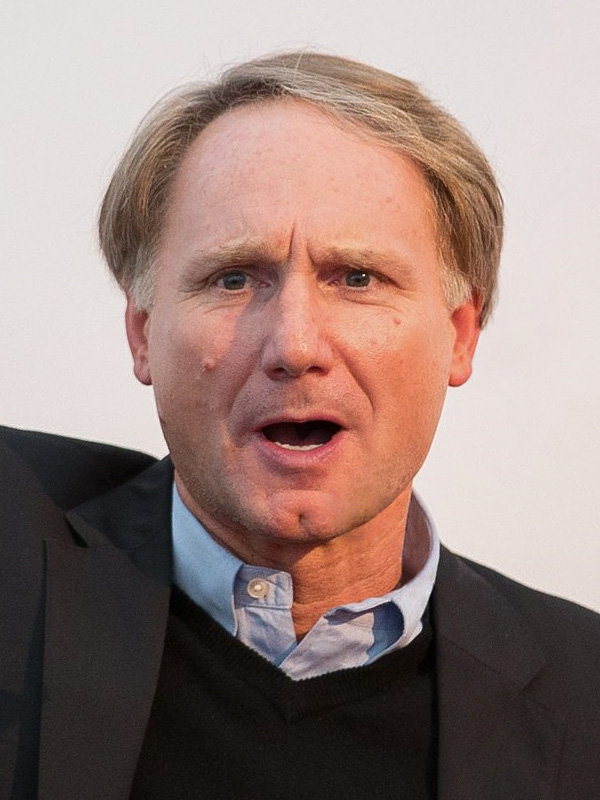
Dan Brown

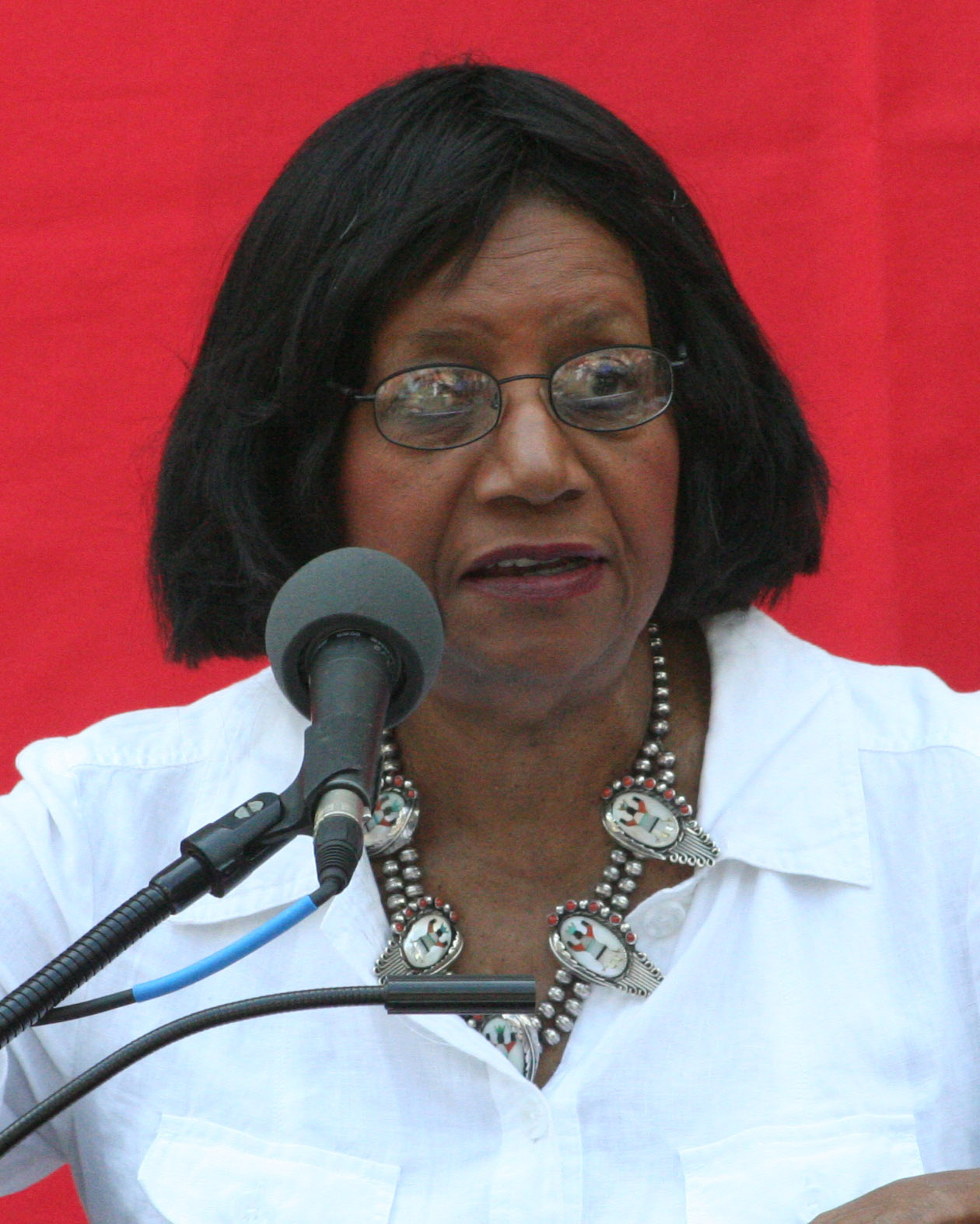
Dolores Kendrick

- John Pickering – federal judge, impeached for drunkenness; trustee 1781–1782
- Paine Wingate – New Hampshire delegate to the Continental Congress; U.S. representative from New Hampshire; U.S. senator from New Hampshire; trustee 1787–1809
- Nicholas Emery – judge on the Maine Supreme Judicial Court; assistant teacher 1797
- Daniel Dana – president of Dartmouth College; instructor 1789–91; board of trustees 1809–1843
- John Taylor Gilman – delegate to the Continental Congress; governor of New Hampshire; president of board of trustees 1795–1827
- Ashur Ware – federal judge; instructor 1804–1805
- Nathan Hale – editor and publisher; introduced regular editorial commentary; instructor 1805–1807
- Alexander Hill Everett – diplomat and politician; assistant teacher 1807
- Nathan Lord – president of Dartmouth College; faculty 1809–1812
- Henry Ware Jr. – mentor to Ralph Waldo Emerson; instructor, 1812–1814
- James Walker – president of Harvard University; faculty 1814–1815
- William Bourne Oliver Peabody – minister and author; assistant instructor 1817
- Ebenezer Adams – first professor of mathematics and natural philosophy
- Nathaniel Appleton Haven – U.S. representative from New Hampshire; president of board of trustees 1828–1830
- Jeremiah Smith – U.S. representative from New Hampshire; judge; governor of New Hampshire; president of board of trustees 1830–1842
- Francis Bowen – philosopher, writer, and educationalist; faculty 1833–1835
- Joseph Gibson Hoyt – chancellor of Washington University in St. Louis; faculty 1840–1858
- Andrew Preston Peabody – Unitarian clergyman and author; board of trustees, 1843–1885
- Amos Tuck – U.S. representative from New Hampshire; founder of the Republican Party; board of trustees 1853–1879
- George A. Wentworth – author of textbooks on mathematics; faculty 1857–1892; board of trustees 1899–1906
- Robert Franklin Pennell – scholar and classicist; faculty 1871–1882
- Charles H. Bell – governor of New Hampshire; trustee 1879–1883
- George Lyman Kittredge – faculty 1883–1887
- T.A. Dwight Jones – faculty
- H. Hamilton "Hammy" Bissell – director of scholarships
- Robert H. Bates – mountaineer; faculty
- Henry Bragdon – historian; faculty member in history department 1945-1974
- Donald B. Cole – historian; faculty 1947–1988
- Dandridge MacFarlan Cole – aerospace engineer, futurist, lecturer, and author; faculty 1949–1953, physics and astronomy
- Winthrop Jordan – historian; faculty member in history department 1955–1960
- Frederick Buechner – writer; theologian; Religion and English faculty and school minister 1958–1967
- Cabot Lyford – sculptor; faculty 1963–1986
- Michael S. Greco – president of American Bar Association; faculty 1965–1968
- George Crowe – ice hockey coach; faculty 1969–1975
- David P. Robbins – mathematician; faculty 1972–1977
- Dolores Kendrick – Poet Laureate of the District of Columbia; faculty 1972–1993
- Dan Brown – New York Times bestselling author; faculty 1993
- Michael Golay – historian; faculty 1999–2021?
- Gwynneth Coogan – U.S. Olympian; faculty 2002–present
- Todd Hearon – faculty 2003–present
- Olutoyin Augustus – Nigerian hurdler; instructor in physical education 2011–2021
- Thomas W. Simpson – faculty 2008–present
- Willie Perdomo – poet laurete of New York State; current faculty

== Notable alumni ==
=== 1780s ===
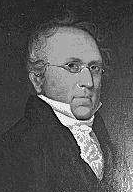
Josiah Bartlett Jr.

- Benjamin Ives Gilman (c. 1783) – Ohio pioneer
- George Sullivan (c. 1783) – U.S. representative from New Hampshire
- Nathaniel Thayer (c. 1783) – Unitarian minister
- Daniel Tilton (c. 1783) – one of the first three judges in Mississippi Territory, Supreme Court of Mississippi Territory
- Josiah Bartlett Jr. (c. 1784) – U.S. representative from New Hampshire
- Samuel Smith (c. 1784) – U.S. representative from New Hampshire
- George B. Upham (c. 1785) – U.S. representative from New Hampshire
- Daniel Meserve Durell (c. 1789) – U.S. representative from New Hampshire; member of Democratic-Republican Party

=== 1790s ===
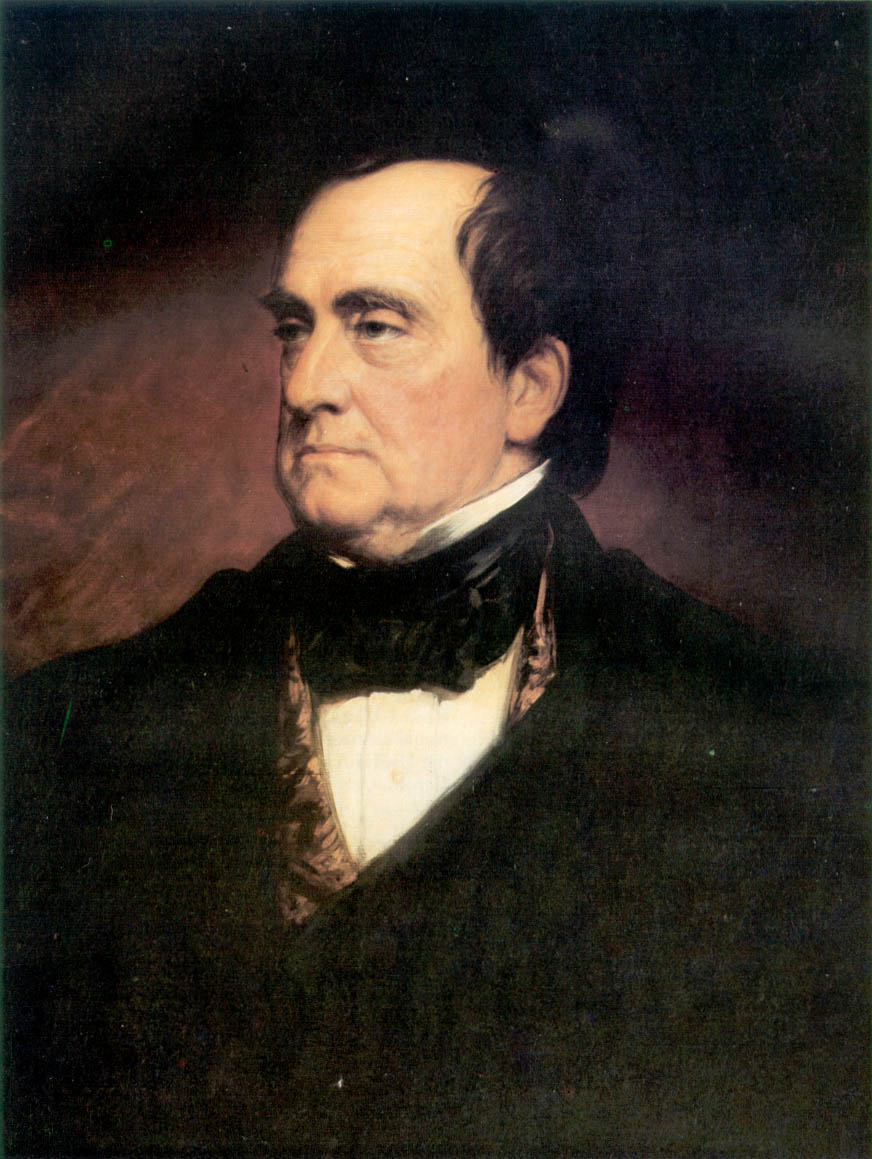
Lewis Cass

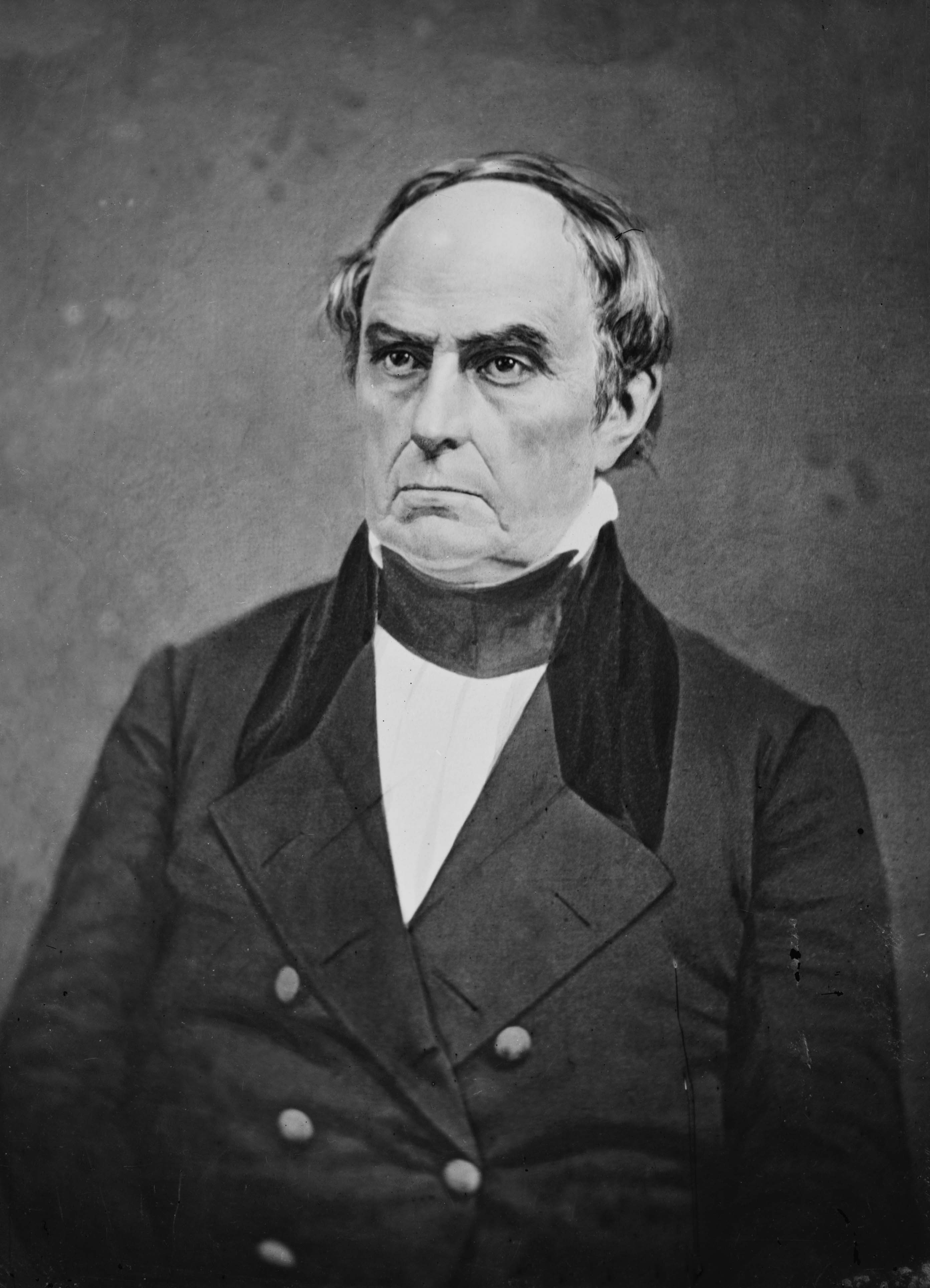
Daniel Webster

- Dudley Leavitt (1790) – publisher, writer, teacher
- David L. Morril (1790) – U.S. senator from New Hampshire, governor of New Hampshire
- Nicholas Emery (c. 1791) – judge on the Maine Supreme Judicial Court
- John Noyes (1791) – U.S. representative from Vermont
- Lewis Cass (1792) – brigadier general; governor of Michigan Territory, U.S. secretary of War; U.S. senator from Michigan; U.S. secretary of state; Democratic candidate for president
- William Ladd (1793) – pacifist, founder and first president of American Peace Society
- Nathaniel Upham (1793) – U.S. representative from New Hampshire
- Samuel Conner (1794) – U.S. representative from Massachusetts
- John Adams Harper (c. 1794) – U.S. representative from New Hampshire
- Edward Little (1794) – attorney, entrepreneur, philanthropist
- Joseph Stevens Buckminster (1795) – Unitarian minister and promulgator of Higher Criticism
- Daniel Webster (1796) – U.S. representative who represented New Hampshire and Massachusetts; U.S. senator from Massachusetts; U.S. secretary of state; diplomat
- Leverett Saltonstall I (1798) – U.S. representative from Massachusetts

=== 1800s ===
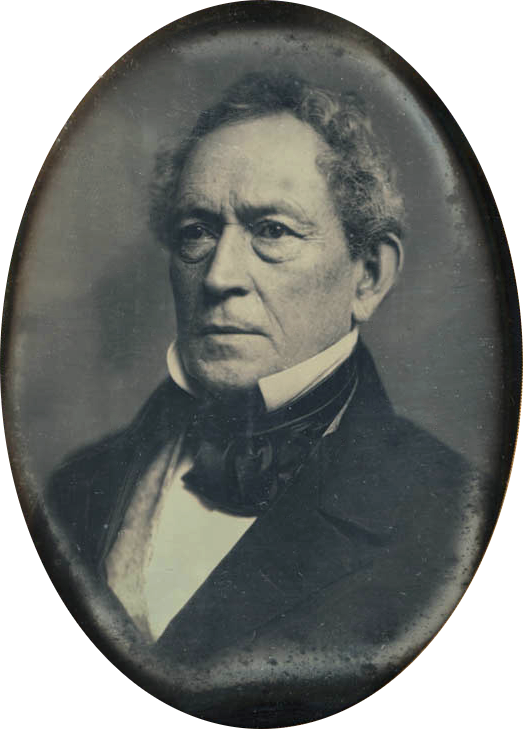
Edward Everett

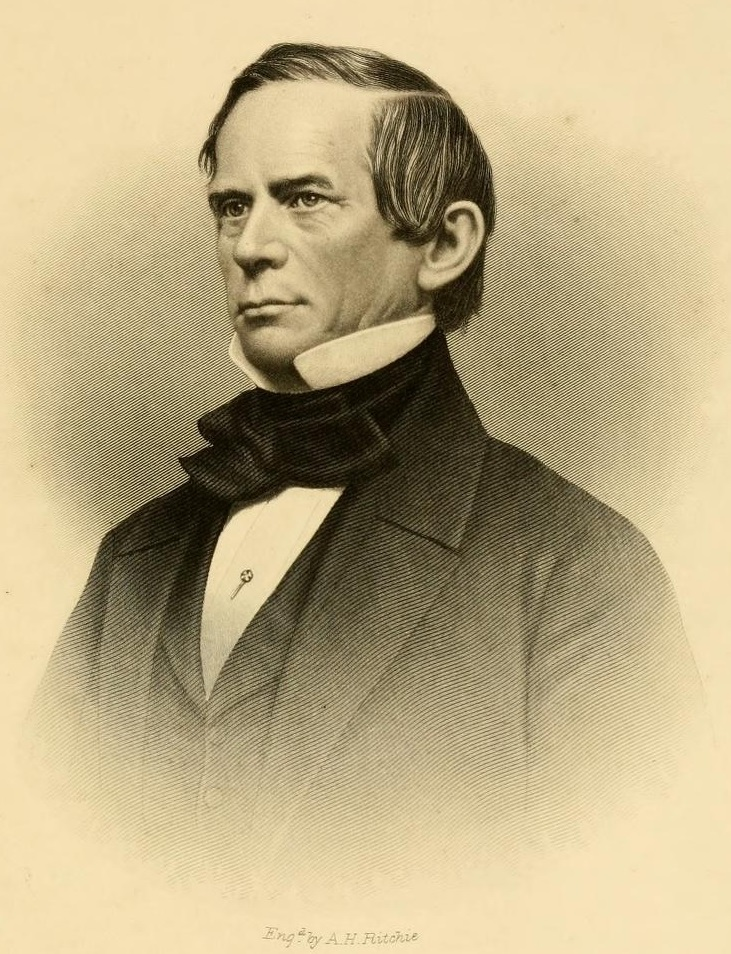
James H. Duncan

- Samuel Livermore (1800) – legal scholar
- Richard Saltonstall Rogers (1800) – East Indies merchant, N. L. Rogers & Bros., Salem, Massachusetts
- Abiel Chandler (1802) – merchant, philanthropist
- Joseph Cogswell (1802) – educator, editor, library administrator
- William Plumer Jr. (1802) – U.S. representative from New Hampshire
- James Carr (1803) – U.S. representative from Massachusetts
- John Perkins Cushing (1803) – China merchant, opium smuggler, philanthropist
- Augustine Heard (c. 1803) – entrepreneur and businessman
- Nicholas B. Doe (1804) – U.S. representative from New York State
- Theodore Lyman (1804) – mayor of Boston, Massachusetts
- Lucius Manlius Sargent (1804) – author, antiquarian, and temperance advocate
- John Lauris Blake (1806) – minister and prolific author
- Benjamin T. Pickman (1806) – president of the Massachusetts State Senate
- Zachariah Allen (1807) – manufacturer and inventor
- Joseph Blunt (1807) – author; editor; politician; New York County district attorney
- Edward Everett (1807) – U.S. representative from Massachusetts; U.S. senator from Massachusetts; governor of Massachusetts, ambassador to Great Britain; U.S. secretary of state; president of Harvard University
- Nathaniel Appleton Haven (1807) – U.S. representative from New Hampshire
- Benjamin Kendrick Pierce (1807) – U.S. Army officer; brother of Franklin Pierce; son of Benjamin Pierce
- James H. Duncan (1808) – U.S. representative from Massachusetts
- James Freeman Dana (1809) – chemist; science author
- Samuel Luther Dana (1809) – chemist; agricultural science specialist; science author
- William Thorndike (1809) – president of the Massachusetts State Senate

=== 1810s ===
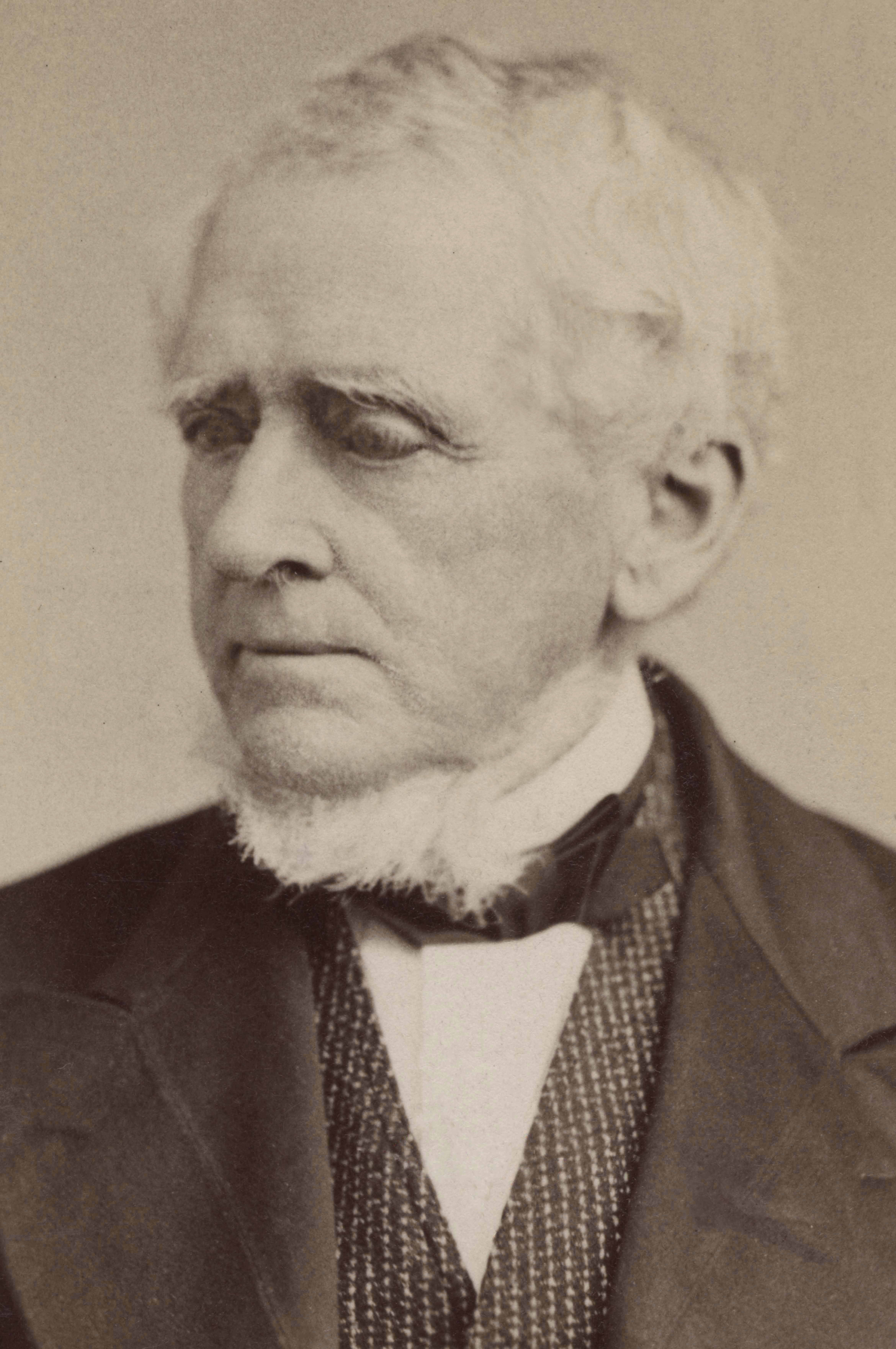
John Adams Dix

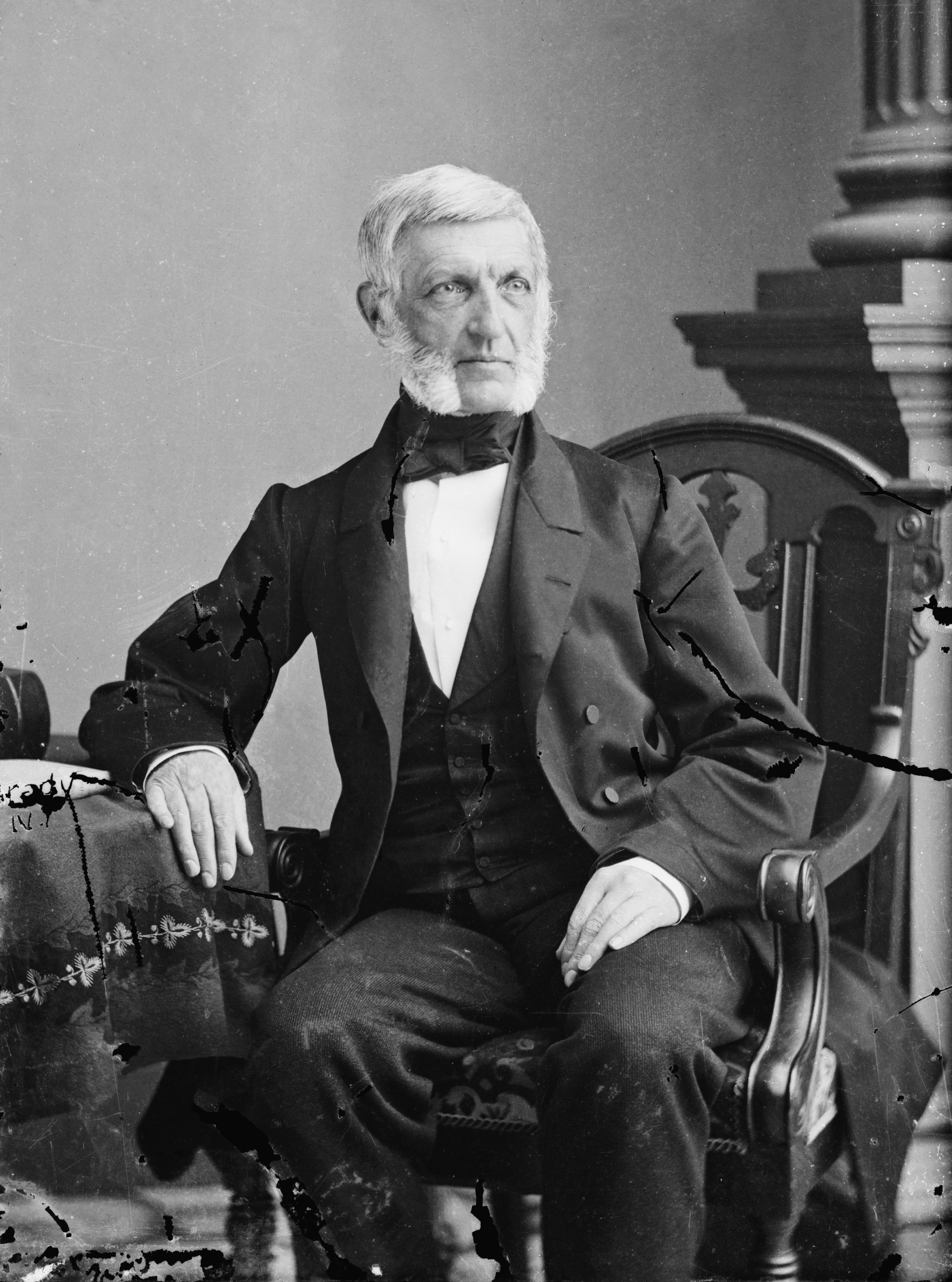
George Bancroft

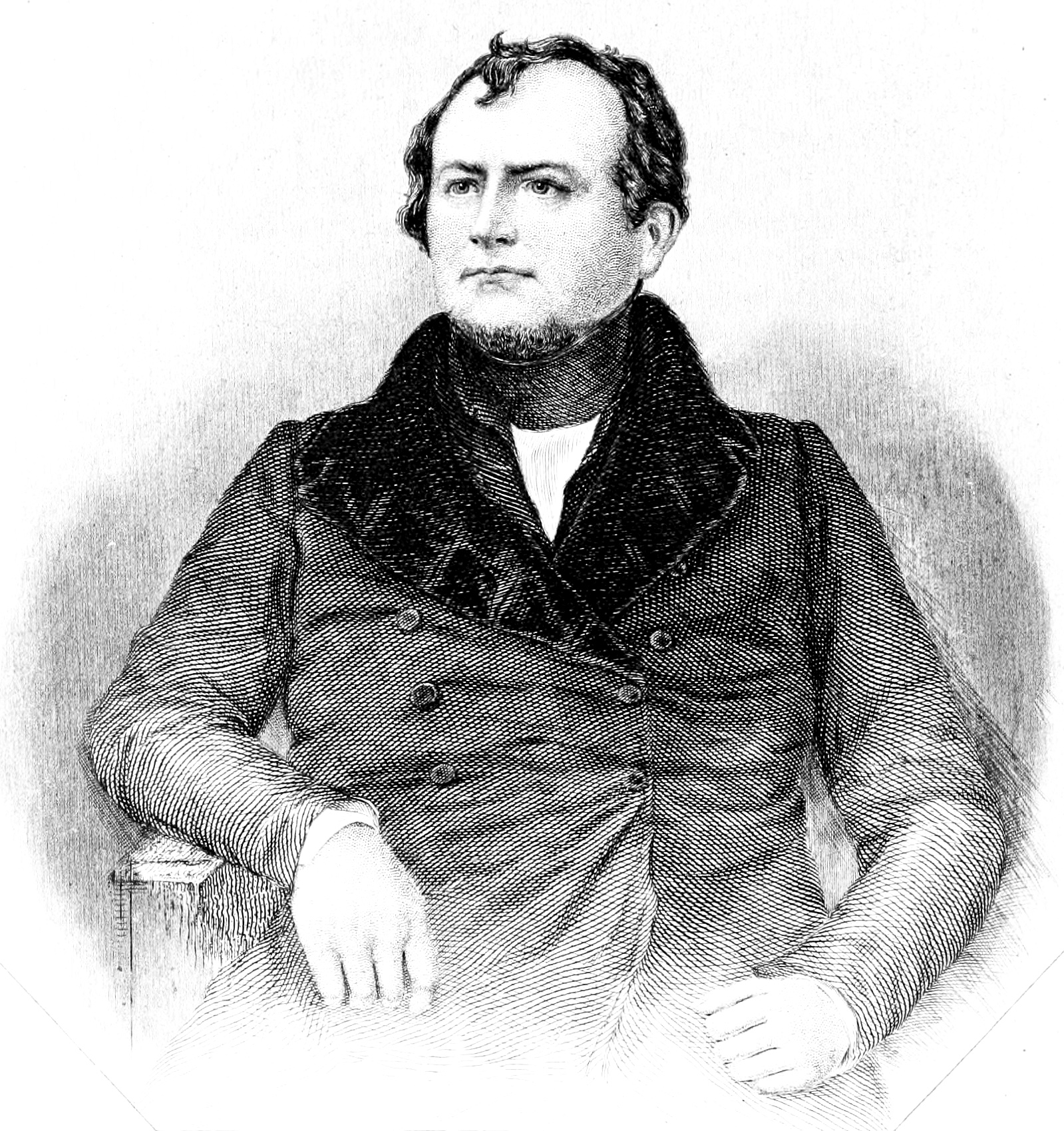
Thomas Wilson Dorr

- John Sherburne Sleeper (1807) – sailor, ship master, novelist, journalist, politician
- William Willis (1808) – mayor of Portland, Maine; railroad president
- Thomas Bulfinch (1810) – author of Bulfinch's Mythology
- John Adams Dix (1810) – U.S. secretary of the Treasury; U.S. senator from New York; governor of New York; U.S. minister to France; railroad president
- Horace Hooker (1810) – Congregationalist minister; author
- William Robinson (ca. 1810) – school founder
- Jonathan P. Cushing (1811) – president of Hampden-Sydney College
- George Bancroft (1811) – historian, secretary of the Navy; founder of the United States Naval Academy; ambassador to the United Kingdom
- John G. Palfrey (1811) – clergyman, U.S. representative from Massachusetts
- Jared Sparks (1811) – president of Harvard University
- Benjamin Ogle Tayloe – businessman
- David Barker Jr. (1812) – U.S. representative from New Hampshire
- Alpheus Spring Packard Sr. (1812) – professor; acting president of Bowdoin College
- William Bourne Oliver Peabody (1812) – Unitarian minister, author
- Charles Paine (1813) – governor of Vermont
- Samuel Edmund Sewall (1813) – lawyer; politician; abolitionist; suffragist
- James Wilson II (1813) – U.S. representative from New Hampshire
- Andrew Leonard Emerson (1814) – first mayor of Portland, Maine
- Gideon Lane Soule (1816) – principal of Phillips Exeter, 1838–1873
- Nathaniel Gookin Upham (1816) – associate justice of the New Hampshire Supreme Court; railroad president; diplomat
- George Lunt (1818) – politician, author, editor, poet
- John Dennison Russ (1818) – physician; innovator in the education of the blind
- Jonathan Chapman (1819) – mayor of Boston, Massachusetts
- Thomas Wilson Dorr (1819) – governor of Rhode Island; leader of the eponymous Dorr Rebellion
- Alfred L. Elwyn (1819) – humanitarian, author
- Russell Sturgis (1819) – merchant, banker

=== 1820s ===
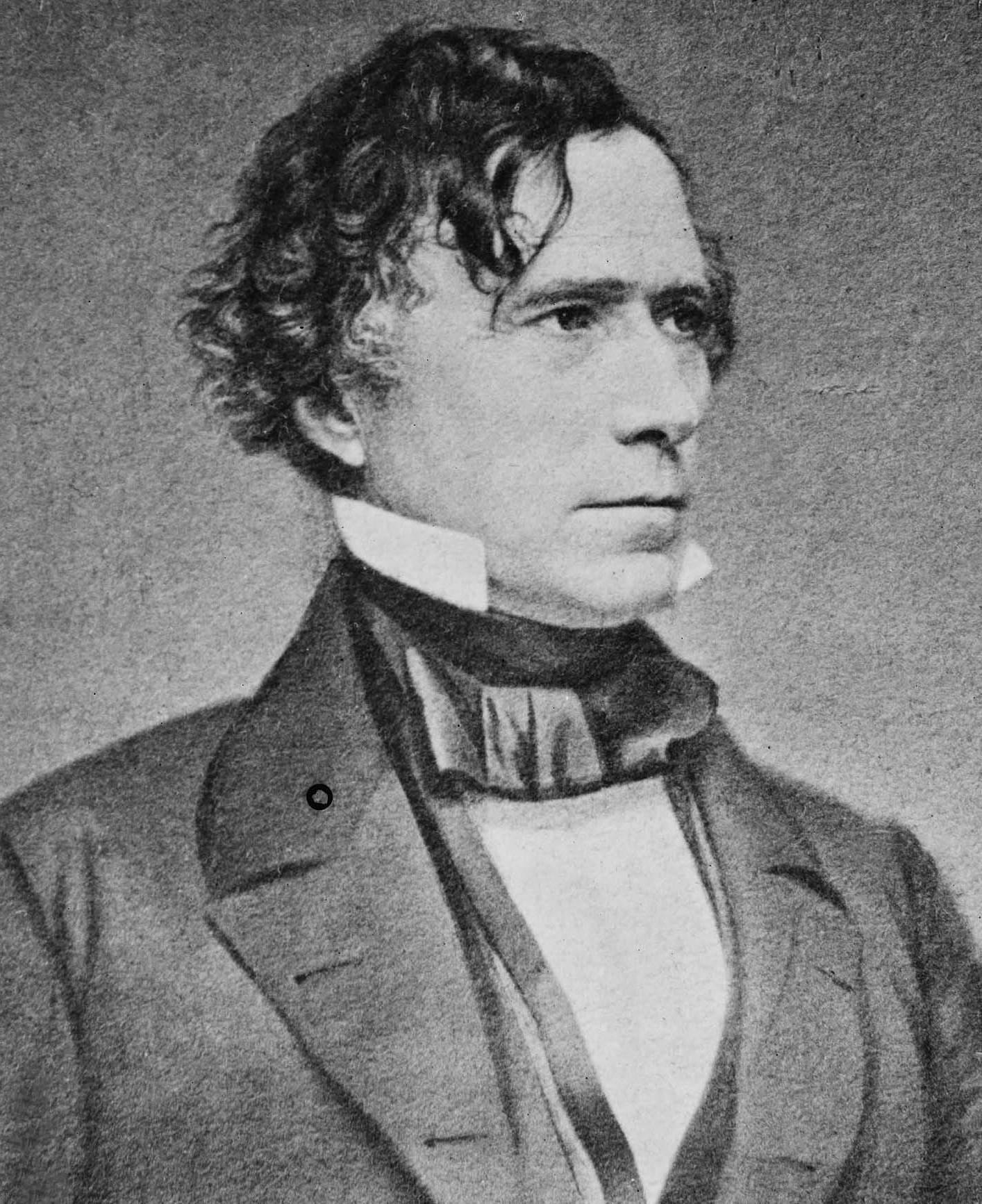
Franklin Pierce

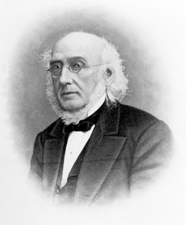
Alpheus Felch

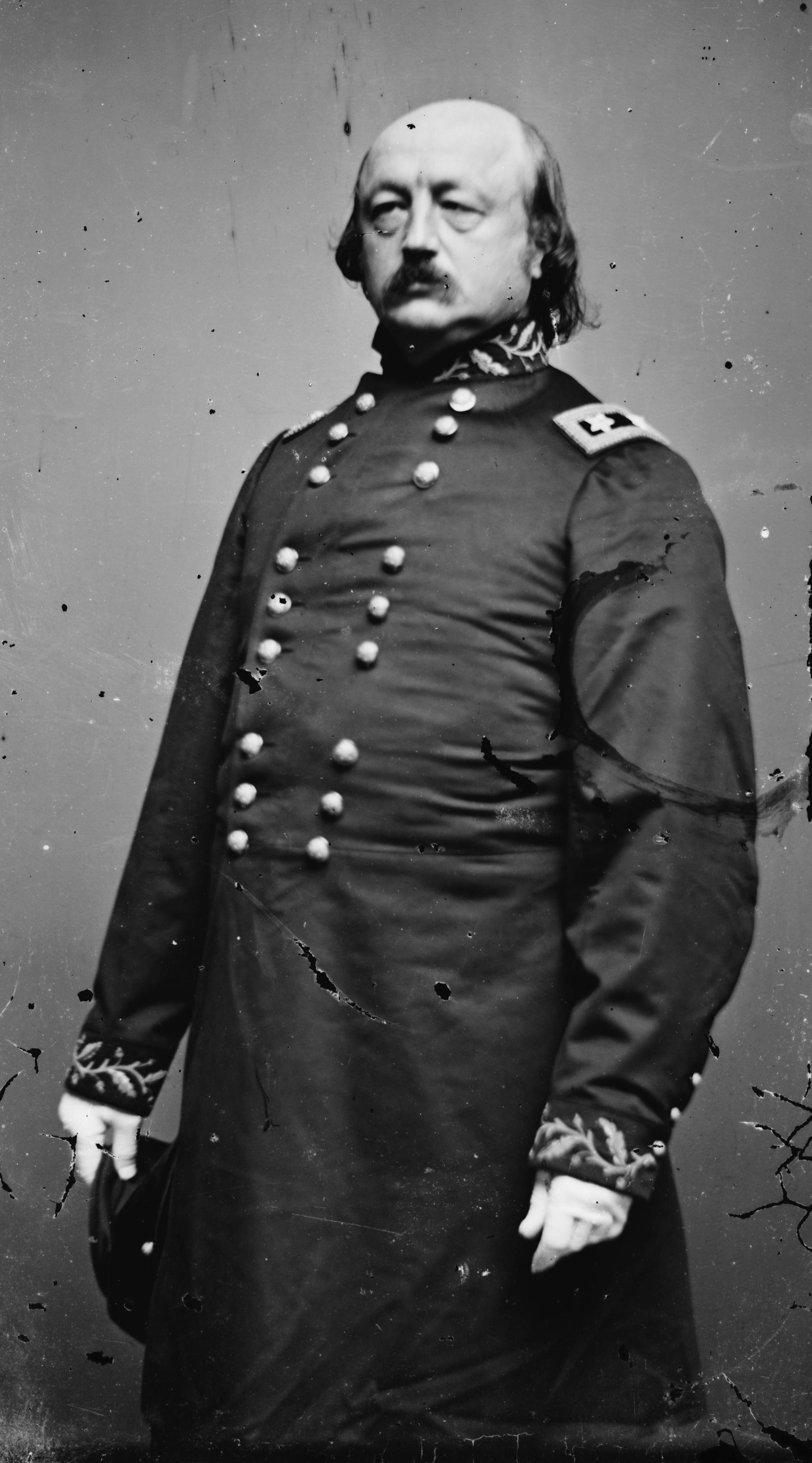
Benjamin Butler

- John P. Hale (1820) – U.S. representative from New Hampshire; U.S. senator from New Hampshire; abolitionist; Free Soil candidate for U.S. president; ambassador to Spain
- Franklin Pierce (1820) – U.S. representative from New Hampshire; U.S. senator from New Hampshire; 14th president of the United States
- Alpheus Felch (1821) – U.S. senator from Michigan; governor of Michigan
- Josiah S. Little (1821) – speaker of the Maine House of Representatives
- Ephraim Peabody (1821) – Unitarian minister; abolitionist
- John Langdon Sibley (1821) – librarian of Harvard University
- Alfred W. Craven (1822) – civil engineer; founding member and president of the American Society of Civil Engineers
- Thomas Tingey Craven (1822) – rear admiral, United States Navy
- George Yeaton Sawyer (1822) – lawyer and politician, justice of the New Hampshire Supreme Court
- Samuel Foster Haven (1823) – archeologist, anthropologist
- Richard Hildreth (1823) – historian, political theorist
- John Hodgdon (1823) – president of the Maine State Senate; mayor of Dubuque, Iowa
- Forrest Shepherd (1823) – geologist
- George Bradburn (1824) – politician and Unitarian minister in Massachusetts
- Francis Ormand Jonathan Smith (c. 1824) – U.S. representative from Maine
- Edward Henry Durell (1826) – mayor of New Orleans, federal judge
- Henry Francis Harrington (1828) – editor of the Boston Herald
- Theodore Howard McCaleb (1828) – federal judge; president of the University of Louisiana
- Francis Bowen (1829) – philosopher, writer, educationalist
- Benjamin Butler (1829) – Civil War general (Union); U.S. representative from Massachusetts; governor of Massachusetts
- Edward Fox (1829) – federal judge
- Timothy Roberts Young (1829) – U.S. representative from Illinois
- Charles Turner Torrey (1829) – abolitionist; convicted of stealing slaves, died in prison
- Jeffries Wyman (1829) – naturalist and anatomist
- Morrill Wyman (1829) – physician and social reformer

=== 1830s ===
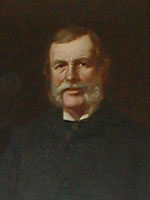
Henry Gardner

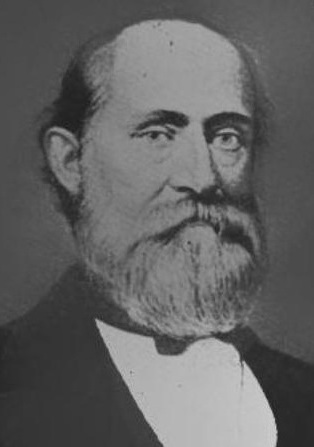
Nathaniel B. Baker

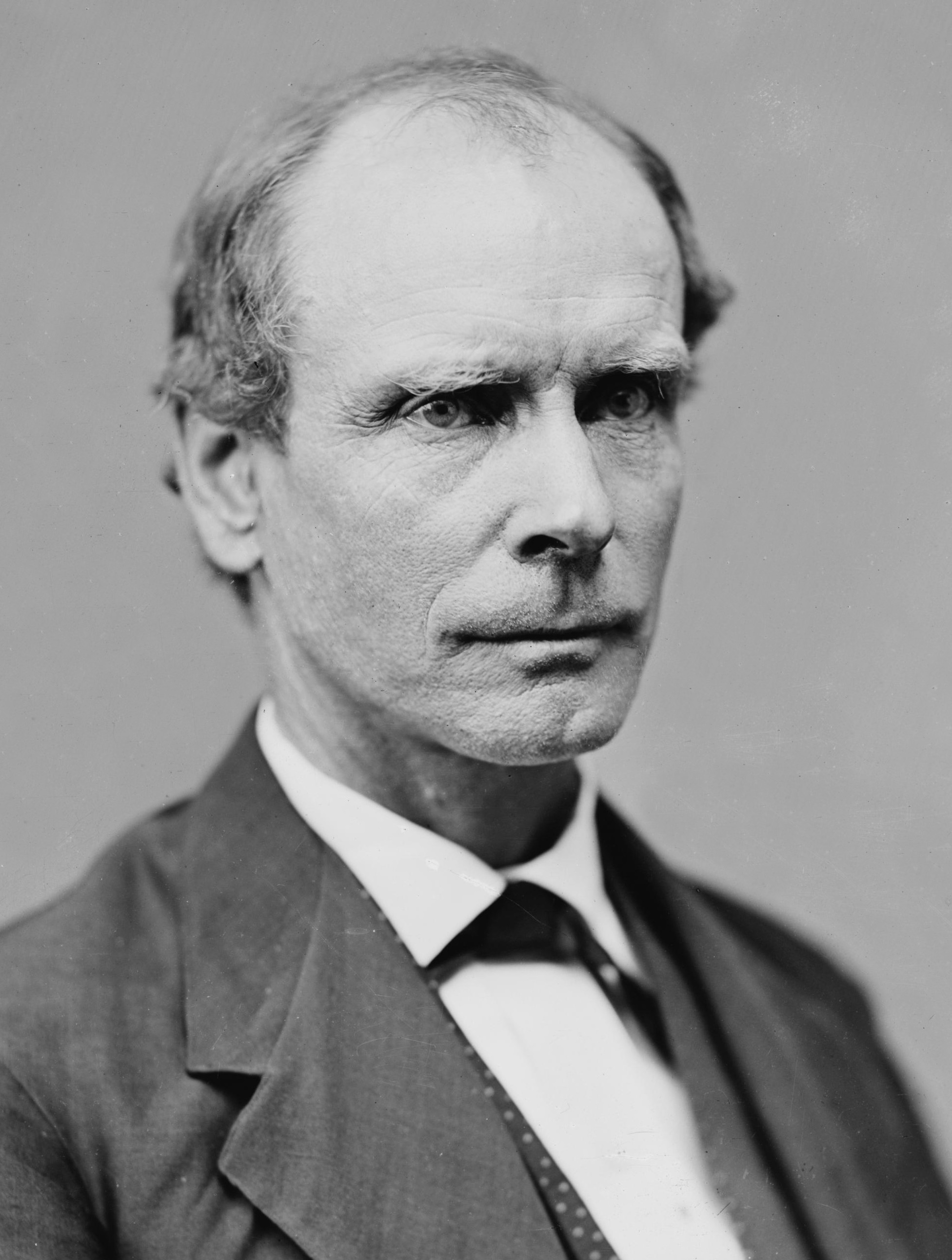
Amos T. Akerman

- Henry Gardner (1831) – governor of Massachusetts
- Horace G. Hutchins (1831) – mayor of Charlestown, Massachusetts
- William Henry Chandler (1832) – politician from Connecticut
- Edmund Burke Whitman (1833) – quartermaster, U.S. Army; superintendent of National Cemeteries
- Nathaniel B. Baker (1834) – governor of New Hampshire
- Charles Jervis Gilman (1835) – U.S. representative from Maine
- Fitz John Porter (1835) – Civil War general (Union)
- John F. Potter (1835) – U.S. representative from Wisconsin
- William B. Small (c. 1835) – U.S. representative from New Hampshire
- Ezra Abbot (1836) – New Testament scholar
- Amos Tappan Akerman (1836) – U.S. attorney general, 1870–1872
- Charles H. Bell (1837) – U.S. senator from New Hampshire, governor of New Hampshire
- Augustus Lord Soule (1837) – associate justice of Massachusetts Supreme Judicial Court
- E. Carleton Sprague (1839) – lawyer, politician, chancellor of the University of Buffalo

=== 1840s ===
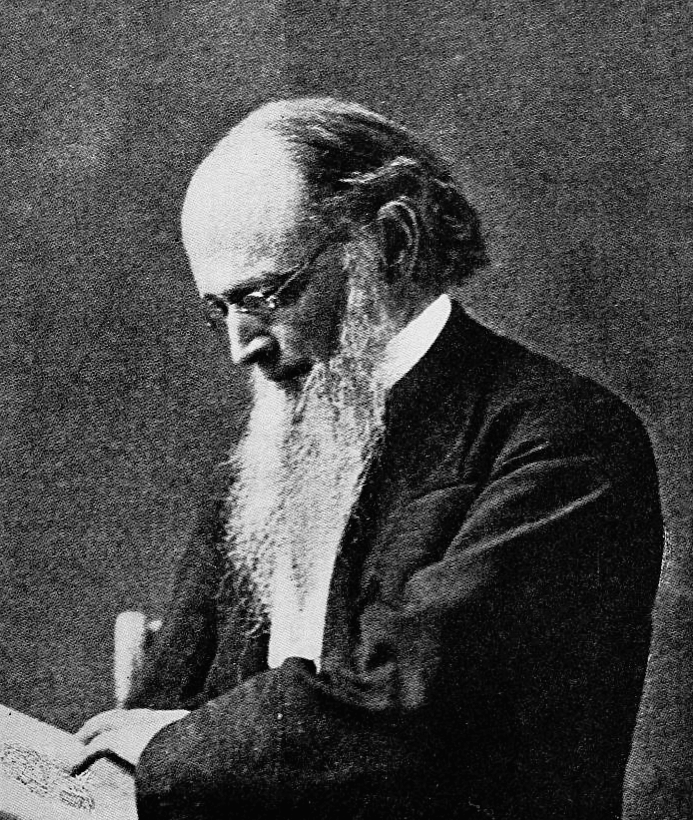
Paul A. Chadbourne

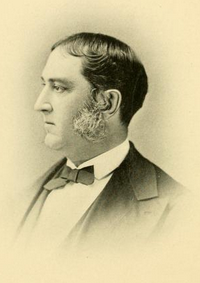
Elijah B. Stoddard

- James Camp Tappan (1840) – Civil War general (CSA), speaker of the Arkansas House of Representatives
- Henry W. Cleaveland (1841) – architect
- Paul A. Chadbourne (1842) – president of University of Wisconsin, Williams College, and University of Massachusetts
- James Cooley Fletcher (1842) – missionary, diplomat, author
- Jonathan Homer Lane (1842) – astronomer
- Elijah B. Stoddard (1843) – mayor of Worcester, Massachusetts
- E. C. Banfield (1845) – U.S. representative from Massachusetts; solicitor of the United States Treasury
- Charles Cogswell Doe (1845) – chief justice of the New Hampshire Supreme Court
- William Fessenden Allen (1846) – privy councillor to King of Hawaii; chairman of the advisory council of the Provisional Government of Hawaii; member of the executive council of the Republic of Hawaii
- Curtis Coe Bean (1846) – delegate from the Territory of Arizona to the U.S. House of Representatives
- George Francis Richardson (1846) – Massachusetts politician
- William Dorsheimer (1847) – U.S. representative from New York; lieutenant governor of New York
- Charles Franklin Dunbar (1847) – editor; political economist; dean of faculty, Harvard University; president of the American Economic Association
- Richard Sylvester (1847) – journalist
- William Robert Ware (1847) – architect, founder of architecture programs at MIT and Columbia University
- Christopher Langdell (1848) – legal scholar, jurist and educator

=== 1850s ===
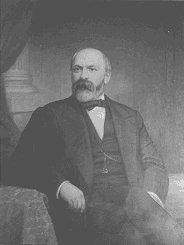
Benjamin F. Prescott

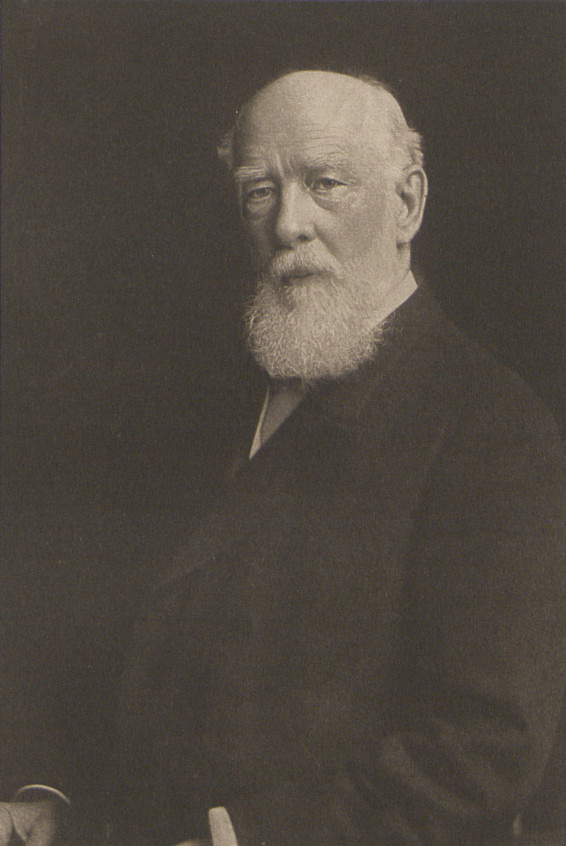
George W. Atherton

- Frederick Lothrop Ames (1851) – business magnate; art collector
- Franklin Benjamin Sanborn (1851) – author, journalist, abolitionist
- Uriah Smith (1851) – Seventh-day Adventist author and theologian
- George Bates Nichols Tower (c. 1851) – civil and mechanical engineer; author
- Benjamin Smith Lyman (1852) – mining engineer, surveyor, linguist
- Benjamin F. Prescott (1852) – governor of New Hampshire
- Charles Pomeroy Otis (1855) – educator; author
- Wheelock G. Veazey (1855) – justice of the Vermont Supreme Court; Medal of Honor recipient (Civil War: Gettysburg)
- George E. Adams (1856) – U.S. representative from Illinois
- Marcellus Bailey (1856) – patent attorney; worked on the patents for the telephone
- Frank W. Hackett (1857) – assistant secretary of the United States Navy
- Edward Rowland Sill (1857) – poet
- George W. Atherton (1858) – president of Pennsylvania State University
- William Ripley Brown (1858) – U.S. representative from Kansas
- Charles Ezra Greene (1858) – civil engineer; author; first dean of the University of Michigan College of Engineering
- Edward Tuck (1858) – banker, diplomat, philanthropist
- George S. Morison (1859) – leading bridge designer
- Henry B. Lovering (1859) – U.S. representative from Massachusetts

=== 1860s ===
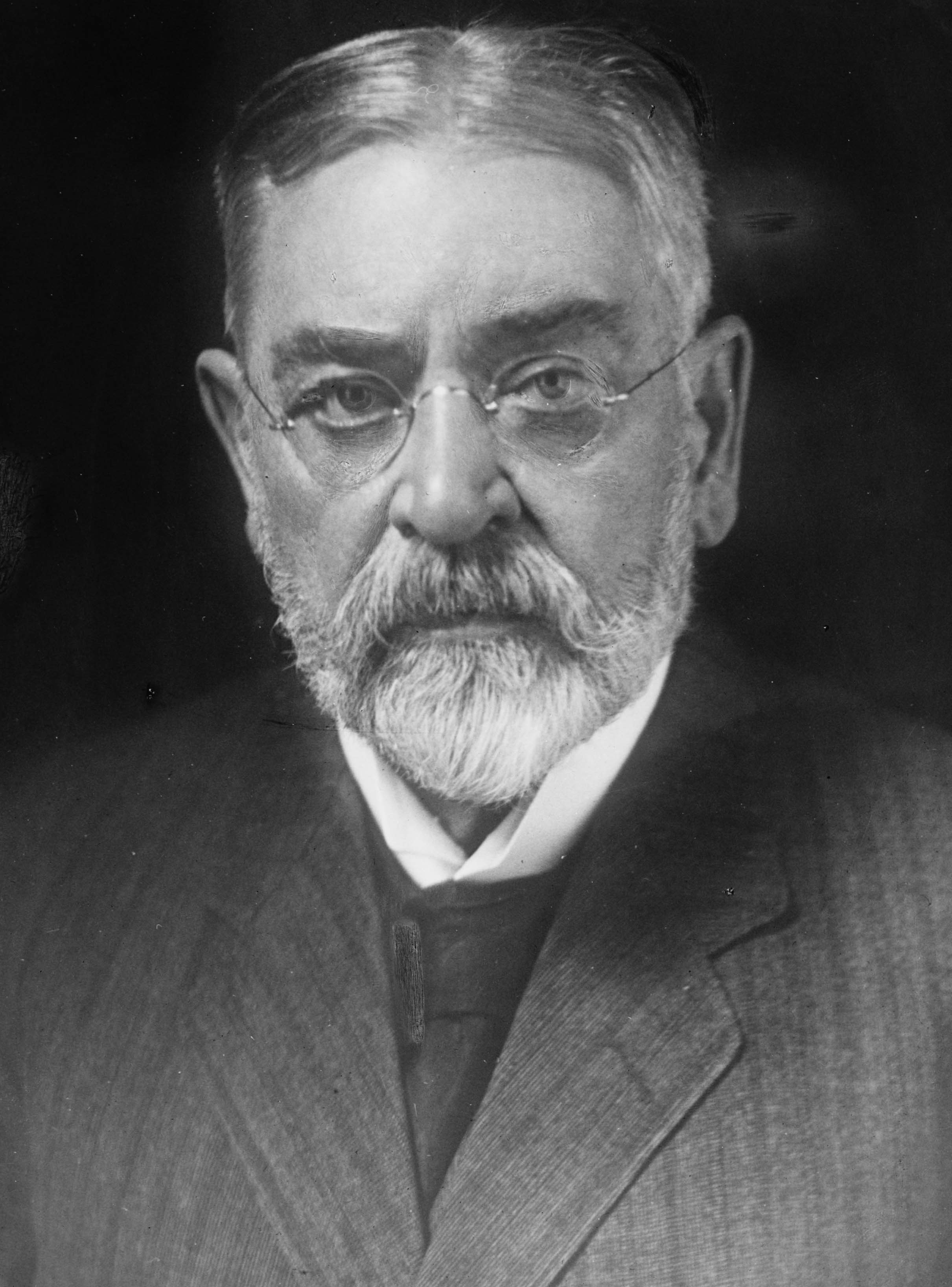
Robert Todd Lincoln

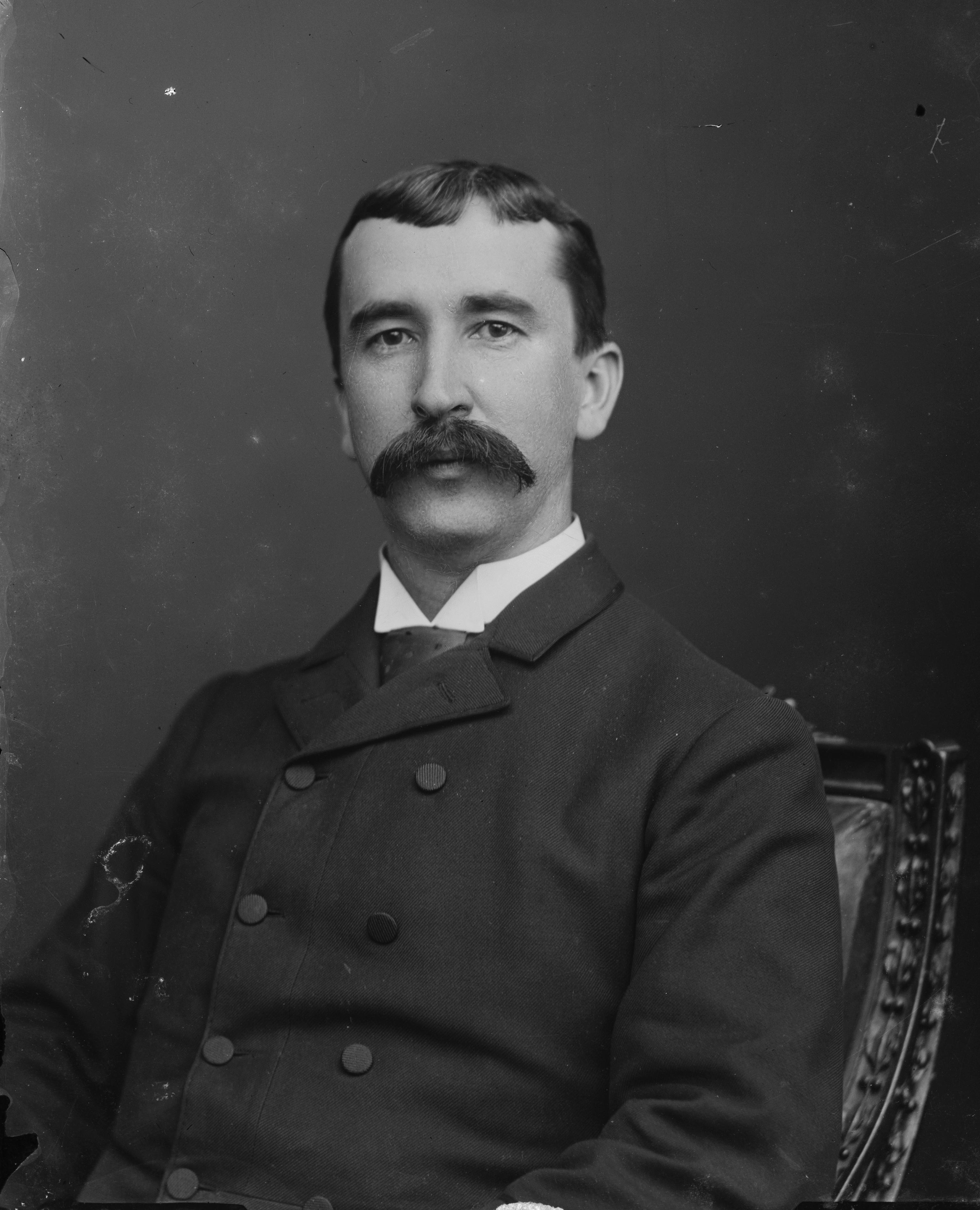
Herbert Baxter Adams

- Jeremiah Curtin (1860) – translator of Native American and Slavic languages; folklorist
- William M.R. French (1860) – first director of the Art Institute of Chicago
- Robert Todd Lincoln (1860) – son of President Abraham Lincoln; U.S. Secretary of War; U.S. Minister to the United Kingdom
- James Greeley Flanders (1861) – Wisconsin politician
- Marshall Snow (1861) – acting chancellor of Washington University in St. Louis
- John White Chadwick (1862) – Unitarian minister and writer
- Augustus Van Wyck (1862) – Supreme Court justice from Brooklyn, New York
- John E. Leonard (1863) – U.S. representative from Louisiana
- Elisha B. Maynard (1863) – mayor of Springfield, Massachusetts; associate justice of Massachusetts Superior Court
- John Ames Mitchell (1863) – architect; writer; publisher, co-founder and president of Life magazine
- George Thomas Tilden (1863) – architect
- Wilmon W. Blackmar (1864) – Medal of Honor recipient (Civil War: Battle of Five Forks)
- Charles Rufus Brown (1865) – Hebrew Bible scholar
- Robert Hallowell Richards (1865) – mining engineer; metallurgist
- Joseph Lyman Silsbee (1865) – architect
- William Gardner Hale (1866) – classical scholar
- Edward R. Bacon (1867) – railroad president; financier; art collector
- John Hubbard (1867) – rear admiral, U.S. Navy
- Herbert H. D. Peirce (1867) – diplomat; third assistant secretary of state; U.S. ambassador to Norway; brother of C. S. Peirce
- Herbert Baxter Adams (1868) – educator and historian
- Winfield Scott Edgerly (1868) – brigadier general, U.S. Army
- Robert Franklin Pennell (1868) – educator and scholar
- Charlemagne Tower Jr. (1868) – U.S. ambassador to Russia and Germany
- Frank O. Briggs (1869) – U.S. senator from New Jersey

=== 1870s ===
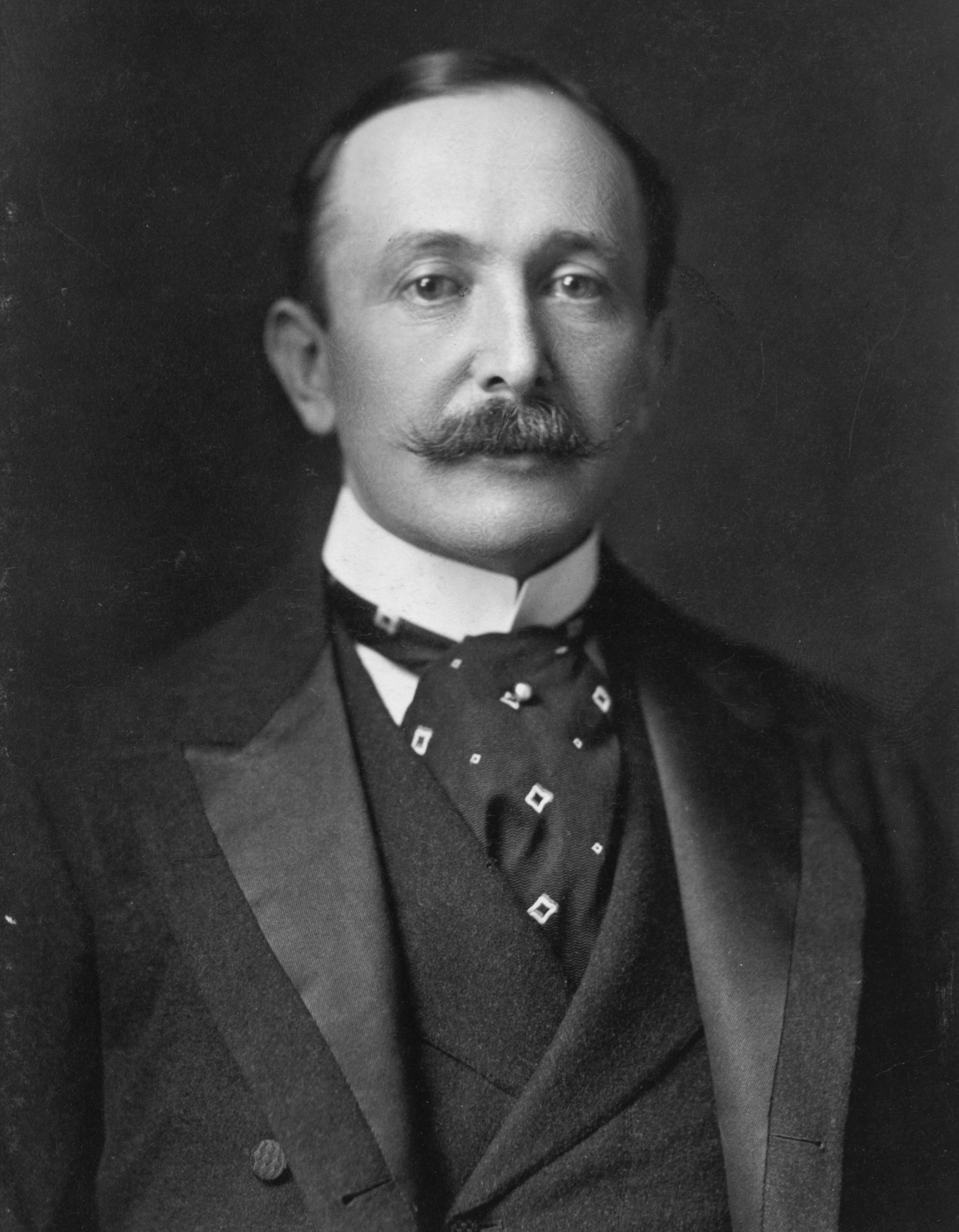
August Belmont Jr.

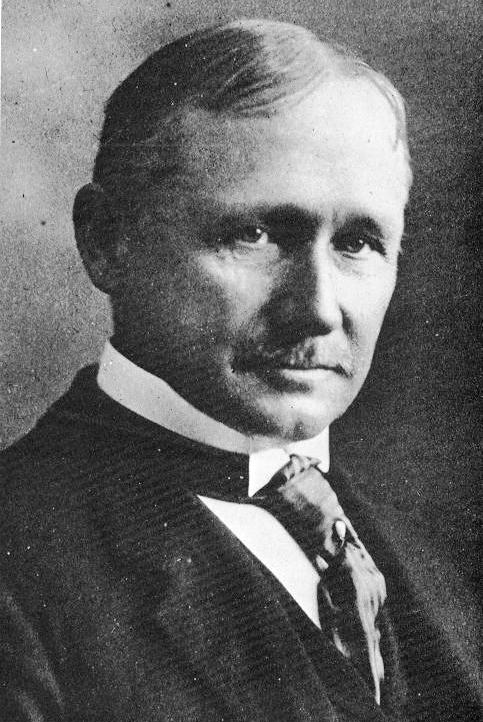
Frederick Winslow Taylor

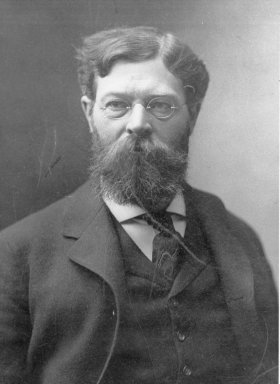
William De Witt Hyde

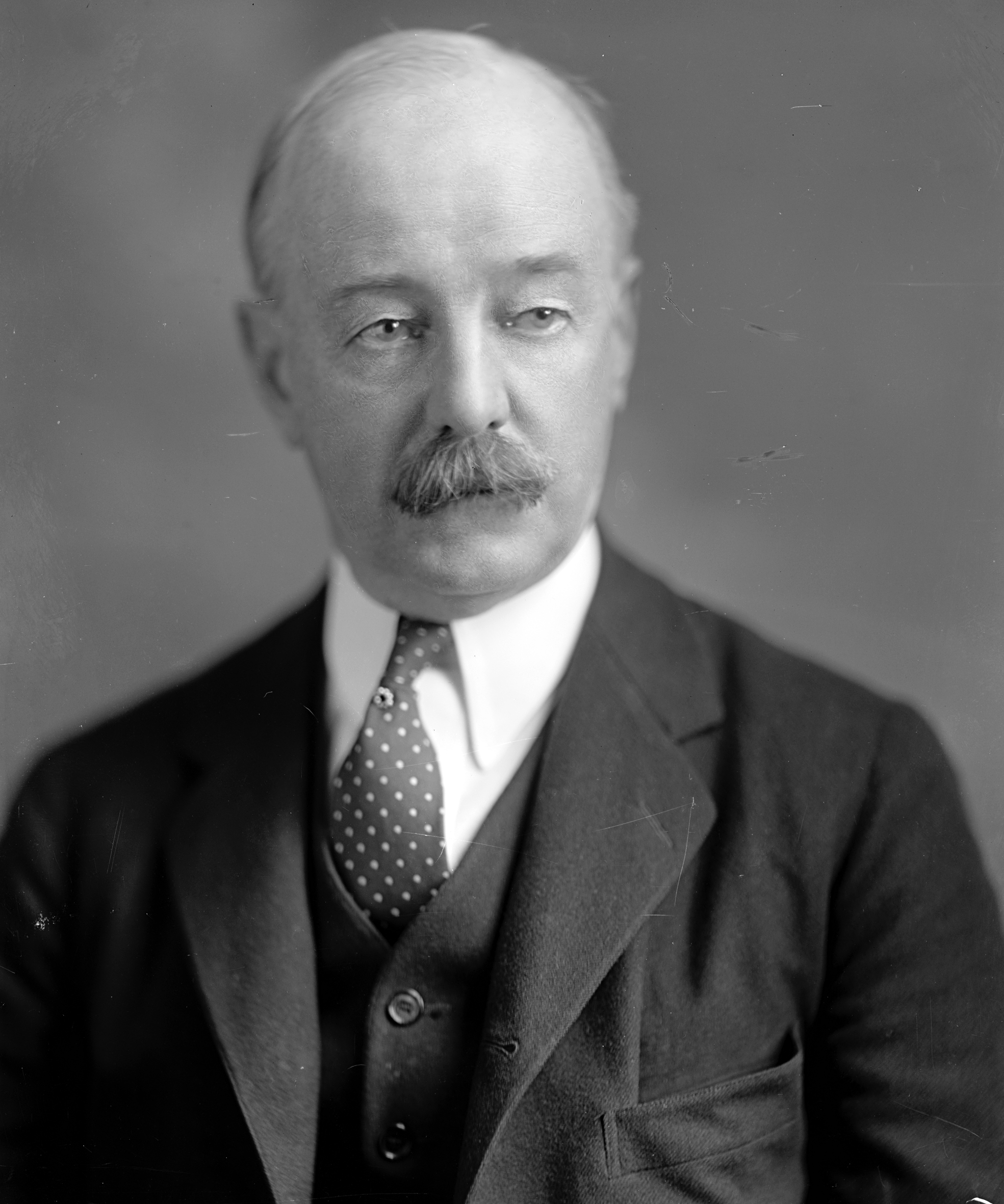
Walter I. McCoy

- August Belmont Jr. (1870) – banker; owner and breeder of thoroughbreds, builder of Belmont Park racetrack
- Erastus Brainerd (1870) – museum curator; newspaper editor; publicist for Seattle, Washington
- Nathan Haskell Dole (1870) – author and translator
- Ulysses S. Grant Jr. (c. 1870) – entrepreneur; son of President Ulysses S. Grant
- Samuel L. Powers (1870) – U.S. representative from Massachusetts
- Sylvester Primer (1870) – linguist and philologist
- Albert D. Bosson (1871) – mayor of Chelsea, Massachusetts
- Nelson Taylor Jr. (1871) – politician from Connecticut
- Philip Hale (1872) – music critic
- Oscar Richard Hundley (1872) – federal judge
- Frank H. Pope (1872) – newspaper reporter; Massachusetts politician
- George Edward Woodberry (1872) – poet and literary critic
- Melville Bull (1873) – lieutenant governor of Rhode Island; U.S. representative from Rhode Island
- Henry G. Danforth (1873) – U.S. representative from New York
- Robert O. Harris (1873) – U.S. representative from Massachusetts
- James Cameron Mackenzie (1873) – transformative headmaster of Lawrenceville School
- George Arthur Plimpton (1873) – publisher and philanthropist
- William Bancroft (1874) – businessman; brigadier general; mayor of Cambridge, Massachusetts
- Benjamin Newhall Johnson (1874) – attorney, historian, owner of Breakheart Hill Forest
- Ogden Mills (1874) – financier; owner of thoroughbreds; philanthropist
- Guy Carleton Phinney (1874) – real estate developer
- Frederick Winslow Taylor (1874) – efficiency innovator; management theorist and consultant; president of the American Society of Mechanical Engineers
- Harlan P. Amen (1875) – principal of Phillips Exeter, 1895–1913
- William De Witt Hyde (1875) – president of Bowdoin College
- Henry Shute (1875) – author
- William Morton Grinnell (1876) – lawyer; banker; diplomat; third assistant secretary of state
- Robert Winsor (1876) – financier, investment banker, and philanthropist
- Timothy L. Woodruff (1876) – lieutenant governor of New York
- H. H. Holmes (1877?) – serial killer
- Charles MacVeagh (1877) – U.S. ambassador to Japan
- William W. Stickney (1877) – governor of Vermont
- Willard S. Augsbury (1878) – businessman, banker, and politician from New York State
- Sherman Hoar (1878) – U.S. representative from Massachusetts
- Walter I. McCoy (1878) – U.S. representative from New Jersey
- William Schaus (1878) – entomologist
- Henry Grier Bryant (1879) – explorer, writer
- S. Percy Hooker (1879) – politician from New York State
- Moses King (1879) – editor and publisher of travel guidebooks
- Francis S. Peabody (1879) – coal baron, ally of Adlai Stevenson

=== 1880s ===
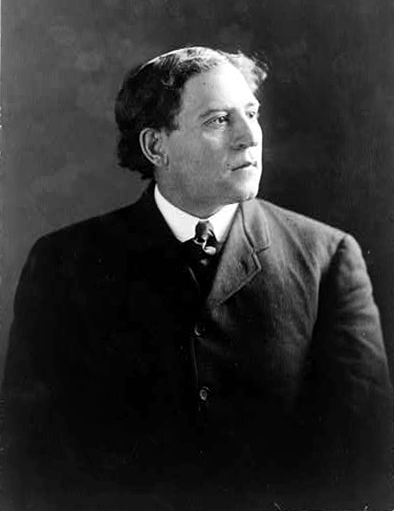
Amos Alonzo Stagg

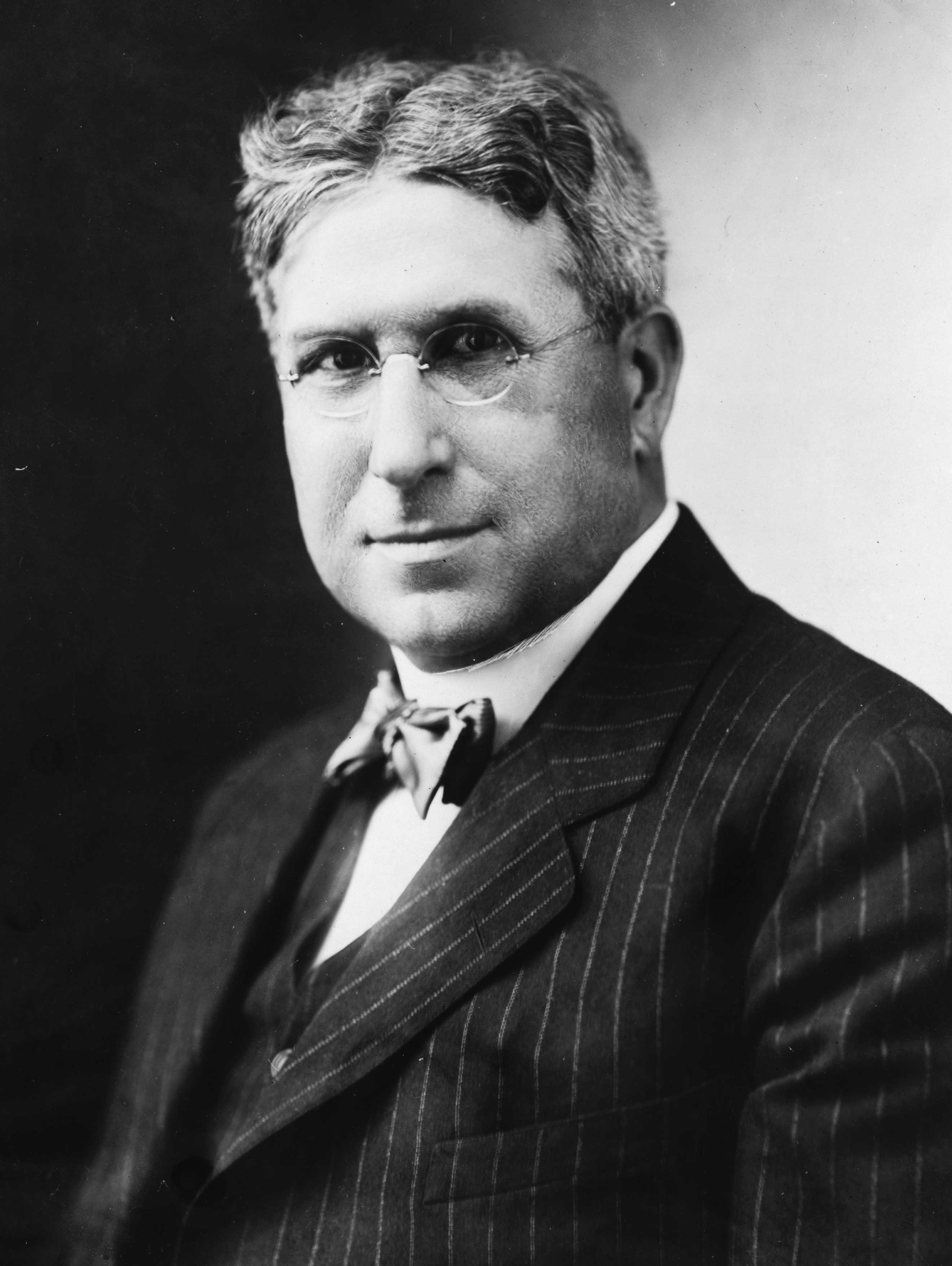
Lindley Miller Garrison

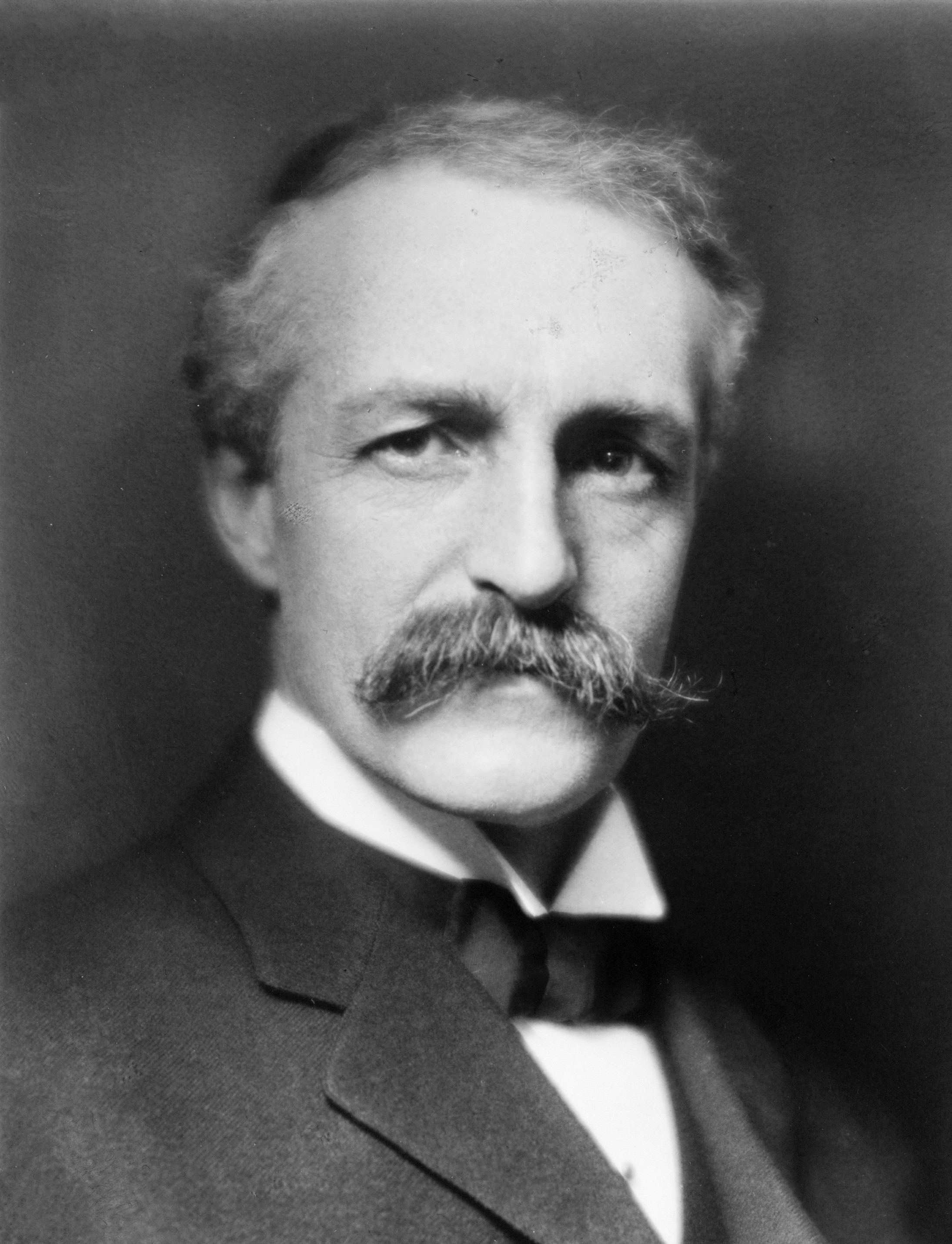
Gifford Pinchot

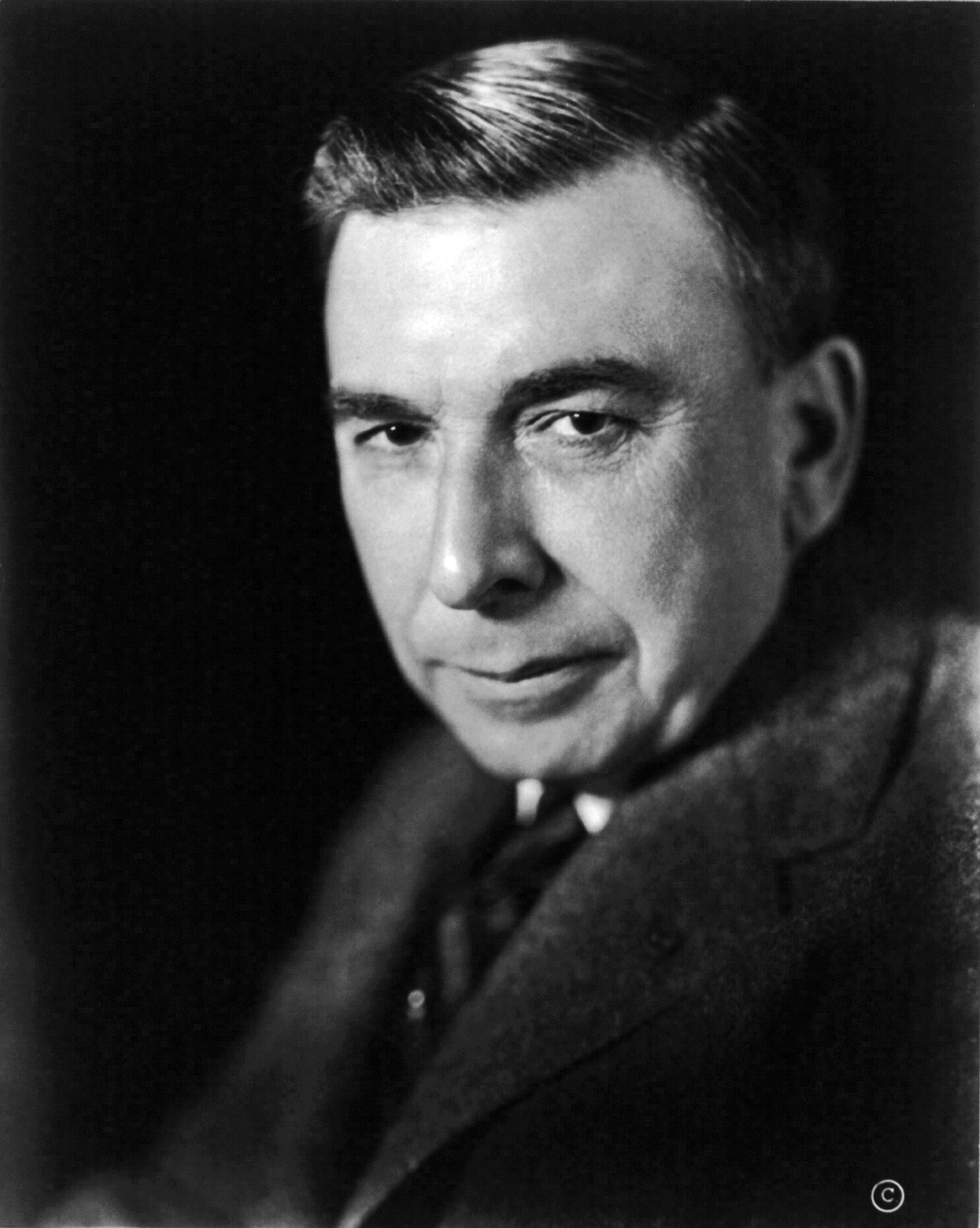
Booth Tarkington

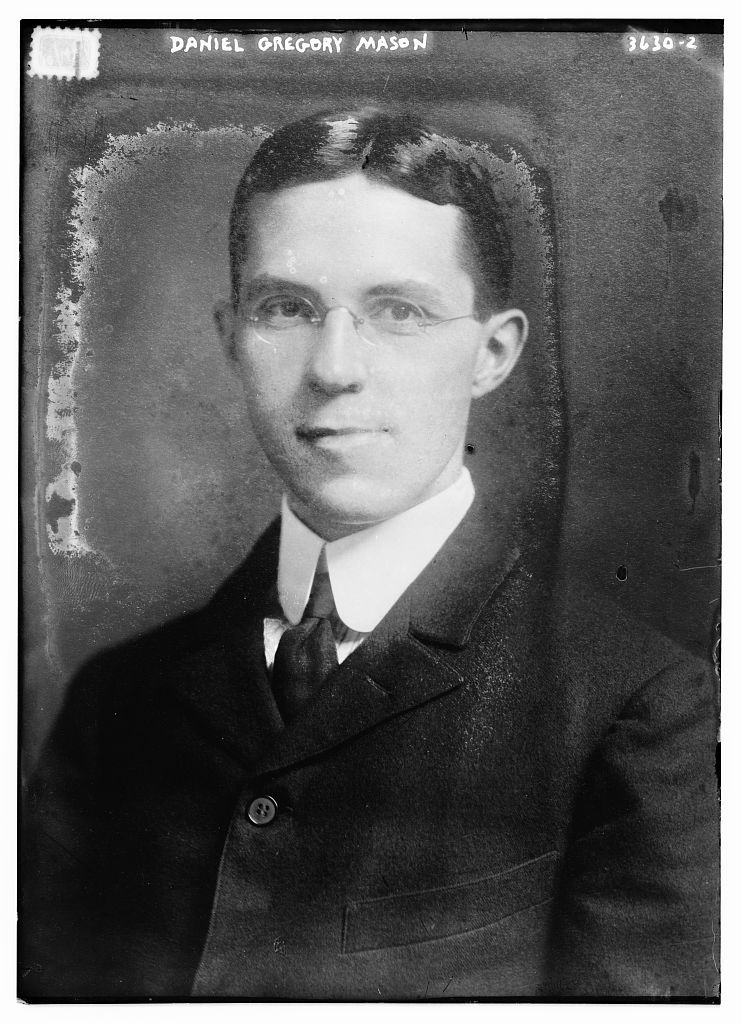
Daniel Gregory Mason

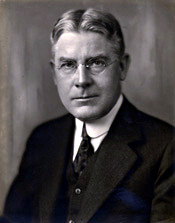
George R. Stobbs

- Joseph Adna Hill (1881) – statistician; devised the method of equal proportions
- Thomas Parker Sanborn (1881) – poet; inspiration for the protagonist of Santayana's The Last Pilgrim
- Charles Augustus Strong (1881) – philosopher and psychologist
- William Woodward Baldwin (1882) – third assistant secretary of state
- Frank G. Higgins (1882) – football player, lawyer, politician, lieutenant governor of Montana
- Edmund Wilson Sr. (1882) – attorney general of New Jersey
- Gordon Woodbury (1882) – U.S. assistant secretary of the Navy
- Joseph H. Walker (1883) – speaker of the Massachusetts House of Representatives
- Larz Anderson (1884) – businessman, diplomat, U.S. ambassador to Japan
- Lindley Miller Garrison (1884) – U.S. secretary of War
- William Mann Irvine (1884) – academic, founding headmaster of Mercersburg Academy
- Wallace Nutting (1884) – photographer
- Bradley Palmer (1884) – attorney, businessman, philanthropist, part of American delegation to the Paris Peace Conference
- John Scammon (1884) – president of the New Hampshire State Senate; associate justice of the New Hampshire Superior Court
- James D. Denegre (1885) – Minnesota state senator and lawyer
- William A. Chanler (1885) – explorer, soldier, U.S. representative from New York
- Morton D. Hull (1885) – U.S. representative from Illinois
- George Hunter (1885) – authority on decorative art
- Walter W. Magee (1885) – U.S. representative from New York
- Gifford Pinchot (1885) – first Chief Forester of the U.S. Forest Service; governor of Pennsylvania
- Guy H. Preston (1885) – US Army brigadier general
- George Rublee (1885) – diplomat, advisor to Woodrow Wilson
- Amos Alonzo Stagg (1885) – All-American football player; won national championships as Football Coach at U. of Chicago; "grandfather of football"
- Augustus Noble Hand (1886) – federal judge
- Tim Shinnick (1886) – professional baseball player: second baseman for the Louisville Colonels
- William Wurtenburg (1886) – played on two national championship football teams at Yale; football coach at Navy and Dartmouth; physician
- Theodore Davis Boal (1887) – U.S. Army colonel; architect
- Bob Huntington (1887) – U.S. Open Tennis Doubles champion (1891, 1892); architect
- James Madison Morton Jr. (1887) – federal judge
- George Higgins Moses (1887) – U.S. senator from New Hampshire, ambassador to Greece
- Curtis Hidden Page (1887) – scholar, author, translator
- William Rhode (1887) – All-American football player; won national championship as football coach at Yale
- Frank Barbour (1888) – football player; football coach at the University of Michigan, businessman
- Coker Fifield Clarkson (1888) – automotive lawyer and general manager of the Society of Automotive Engineers
- John Cranston (1888) – All-American football player; football coach at Harvard University
- Robert Boal Fort (1888) – Illinois politician
- Thomas Lamont (1888) – partner and chairman of board of directors of J.P. Morgan & Co.
- Lee McClung (1888) – All-American football player; treasurer of the United States
- Horace Tracy Pitkin (1888) – missionary beheaded during Boxer Rebellion
- Frank St. John Sidway (1888) – New York State politician
- Samuel Washington Weis (1888) – painter
- Robert D. Farquhar (1889) – architect
- Ogden H. Hammond (1889) – U.S. ambassador to Spain
- Booth Tarkington (1889) – Pulitzer Prize winner

=== 1890s ===
- Butler Ames (1890) – U.S. representative from Massachusetts
- Carroll Bond (1890) – chief judge of the Supreme Court of the U.S. State of Maryland, the Court of Appeals
- Henry M. Crane (1891) – automotive engineer and pioneer
- George Lawrence Day (1890) – a.k.a. John Mapes Adams, Medal of Honor recipient (Boxer Rebellion)
- Marshall Newell (1890) – All-American football player; football coach at Cornell University
- Lewis Stevenson (1890) – son of Vice President Adlai Stevenson; Democratic Party leader; Illinois secretary of state
- William Boyce Thompson (1890) – mining engineer, financier, philanthropist
- Julian Coolidge (1891) – mathematician; president of the Mathematical Association of America
- Henry M. Crane (c. 1891) – pioneering automobile designer
- Louis W. Hill (1891) – railroad magnate
- John Howland (1891) – pediatrician
- Henry McKee Minton (1891) – physician, co-founder of Sigma Pi Phi
- Winfred Thaxter Denison (1892) – Secretary of the Interior of the Philippines
- Daniel Gregory Mason (1892) – composer, music critic
- Hiland Orlando Stickney (1892) – football coach at University of Wisconsin and Oregon State University
- Charles Loring (1893) – chief justice of the Minnesota Supreme Court
- William Belmont Parker (1893) – author and editor
- Carl Frelinghuysen Gould (1894) – architect
- Lawrence B. Hamlin (1895) – purveyor of Hamlin's Wizard Oil, fined for false advertising
- George R. Stobbs (1895) – U.S. representative from Massachusetts
- Charles R. Forbes (1896) – director of the Veterans' Bureau
- Doc Powers (c. 1896) – professional baseball player
- Walter Dearborn (1897) – experimental psychologist; specialist in reading education
- William F. Donovan (1897) – athletic ringer; football coach at Harvard University
- Burt Z. Kasson (1897) – politician from New York State
- Roscoe Conkling Bruce (1898) – educator
- Robert William Sawyer (1898) – journalist, conservationist
- Samuel Davis Wilson (1898) – mayor of Philadelphia
- Barry Faulkner (1899) – muralist
- Robert Leavitt (1899) – Olympic gold medalist, 110m hurdles
- Charles M. Olmsted (1899) – aeronautical engineer

=== 1900s ===
Jay R. Benton

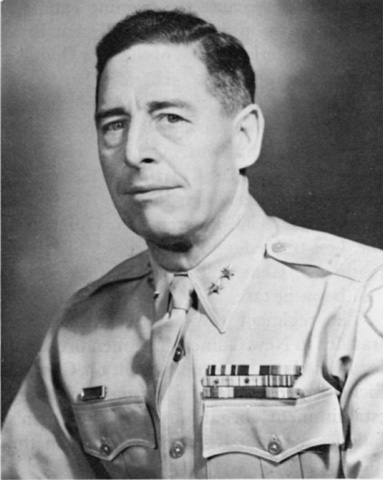
Edwin F. Harding

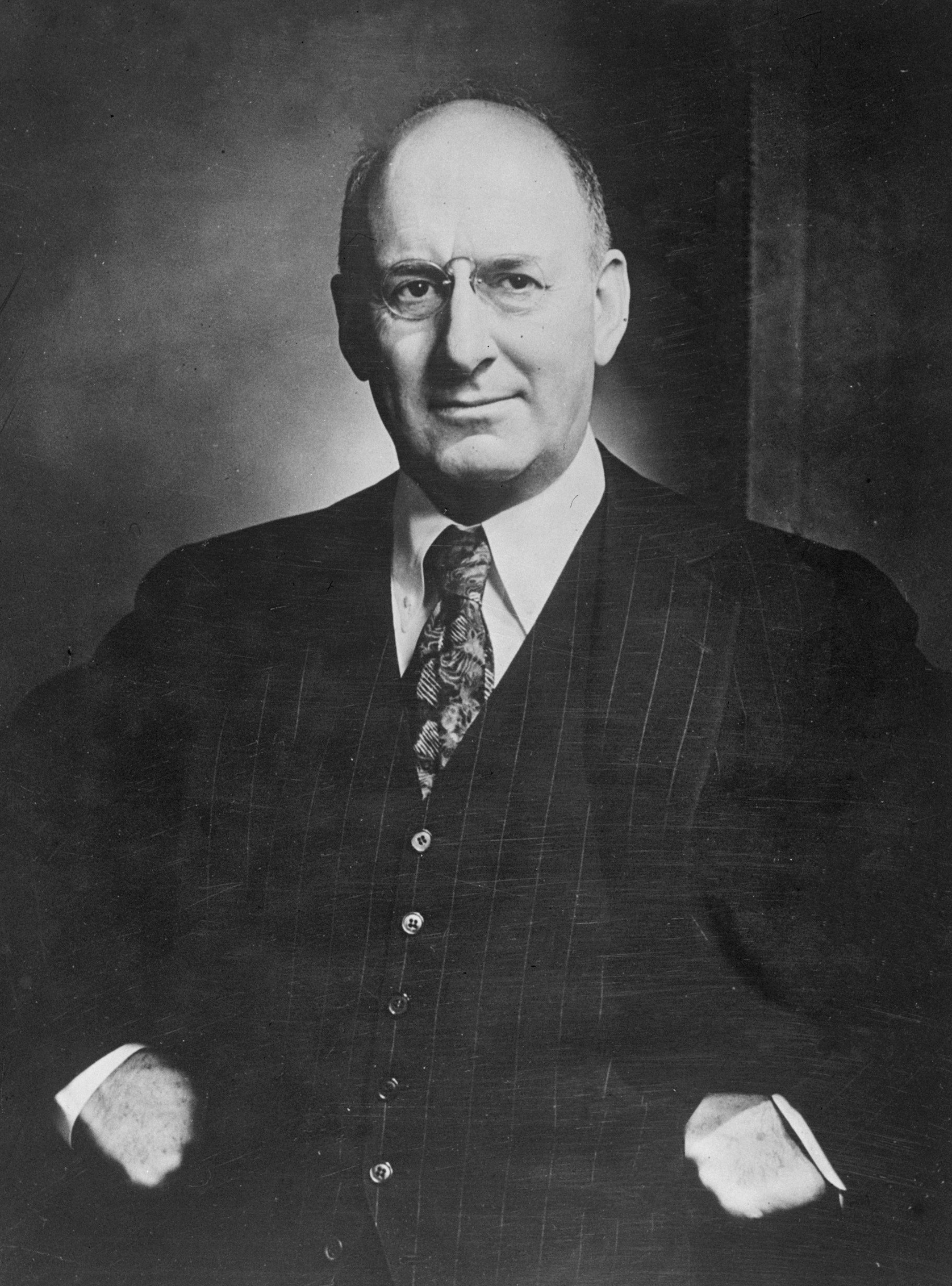
Henry Morgenthau Jr.

- Arthur Nash (1900) – architect
- Myron E. Witham (1900) – All-American football player; football coach at Purdue and the University of Colorado
- Swinburne Hale (1901) – civil rights attorney; a founder of the American Civil Liberties Union; poet
- James Hogan (1901) – All-American football player
- Walter Nelles (1901) – a founder of the American Civil Liberties Union
- Foster Rockwell (1901) – All-American football player; football coach at Yale and Navy; won national championship coaching at Yale; hotelier
- Ralph B. Strassburger (1901) – businessman, thoroughbred owner and breeder
- Joseph Gilman (1902) – All-American football player, businessman
- Samuel M. Harrington (1902) – brigadier general
- J. W. Knibbs (1902) – football player; football coach at University of California, Berkeley
- James Cooney (1903) – All-American football player
- Sterling Dow (1903) – classical archaeologist and epigrapher
- Nicholas V. V. Franchot II (1903) – businessman and New York State politician
- Hugo W. Koehler (1903) – U.S. Navy commander; military attaché to Russia
- Samuel Abraham Marx (1903) – architect and interior designer
- Jay R. Benton (1904) – Massachusetts attorney general
- Edwin F. Harding (1904) – U.S. Army major general, commander of 32nd Infantry Division during WW II
- Howard Jones (1904) – football coach; won national championships coaching Yale and USC
- T. A. Dwight Jones (1904) – All-American football player; Yale football coach
- Jim McCormick (1904) – All-American football player; football coach at Princeton
- F. Harold Van Orman (1904) – lieutenant governor of Indiana
- Harrie B. Chase (1905) – federal judge
- Richard Grozier (1905) – owner, publisher, and editor of The Boston Post; responsible for exposing Charles Ponzi
- Roger Sherman Hoar (1905) – lawyer, politician, science fiction author
- William Rand (1905) – Olympic athlete (1908, 110m hurdles)
- Thomas C. Coffin (1906) – U.S. representative from Idaho
- Haniel Long (1906) – poet, novelist, publisher and academic
- Henry Morgenthau Jr. (1906) – U.S. Secretary of Treasury under Franklin D. Roosevelt (did not graduate)
- Andrew Tombes (1906) – comedian and character actor
- Justin Woodward Harding (c. 1907) – federal judge; trial judge at Nuremberg
- Ed Wheelan (1907) – cartoonist
- Robert Benchley (1908) – author; member of original staff of The New Yorker; actor
- Frank M. Dixon (c. 1908) – governor of Alabama; a founder of the States' Rights Party ("Dixiecrats")
- Arthur Bluethenthal (1909) – All-American football player; decorated World War I pilot
- Walter William Spencer Cook (c. 1909) – Spanish Medieval art historian and professor
- John Paul Jones – Olympic runner and baseball player (1912); world record holder in the mile run

=== 1910s ===
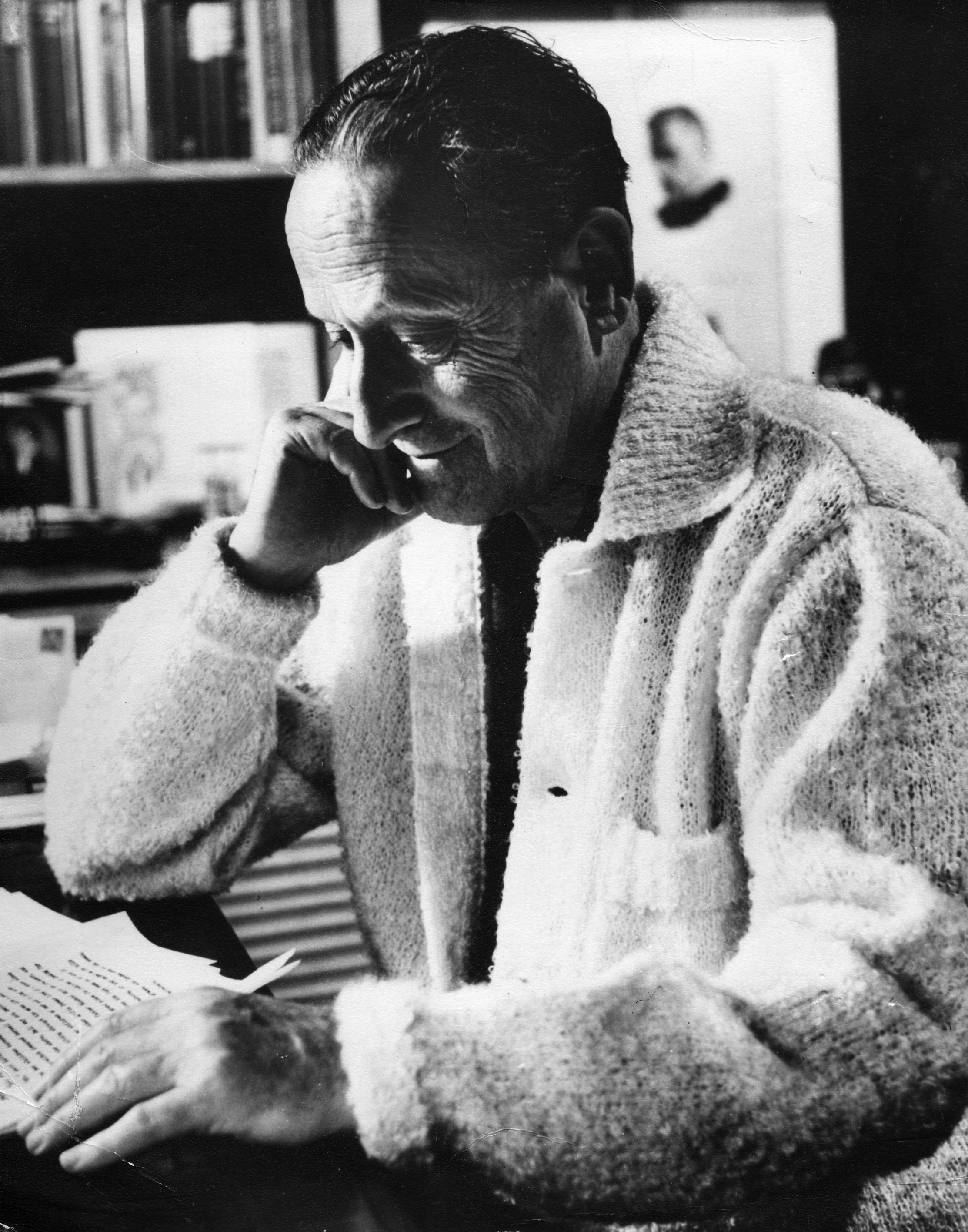
Robert Nathan

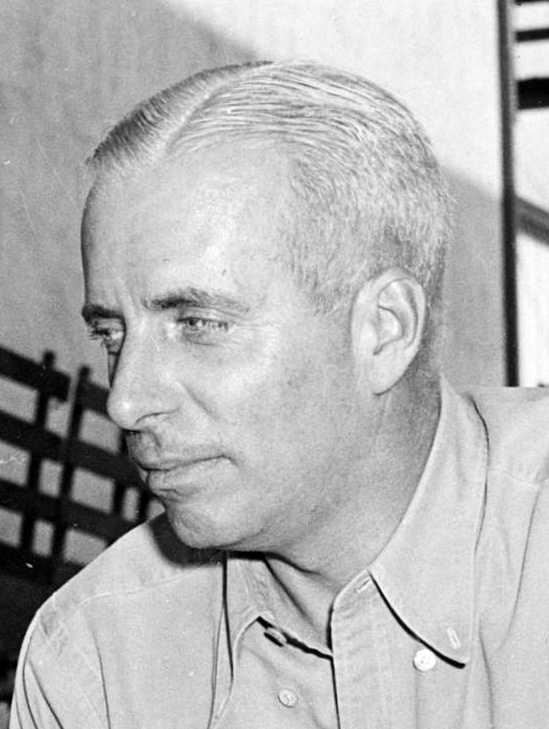
Howard Hawks

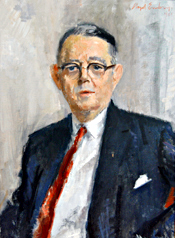
Robert B. Chiperfield

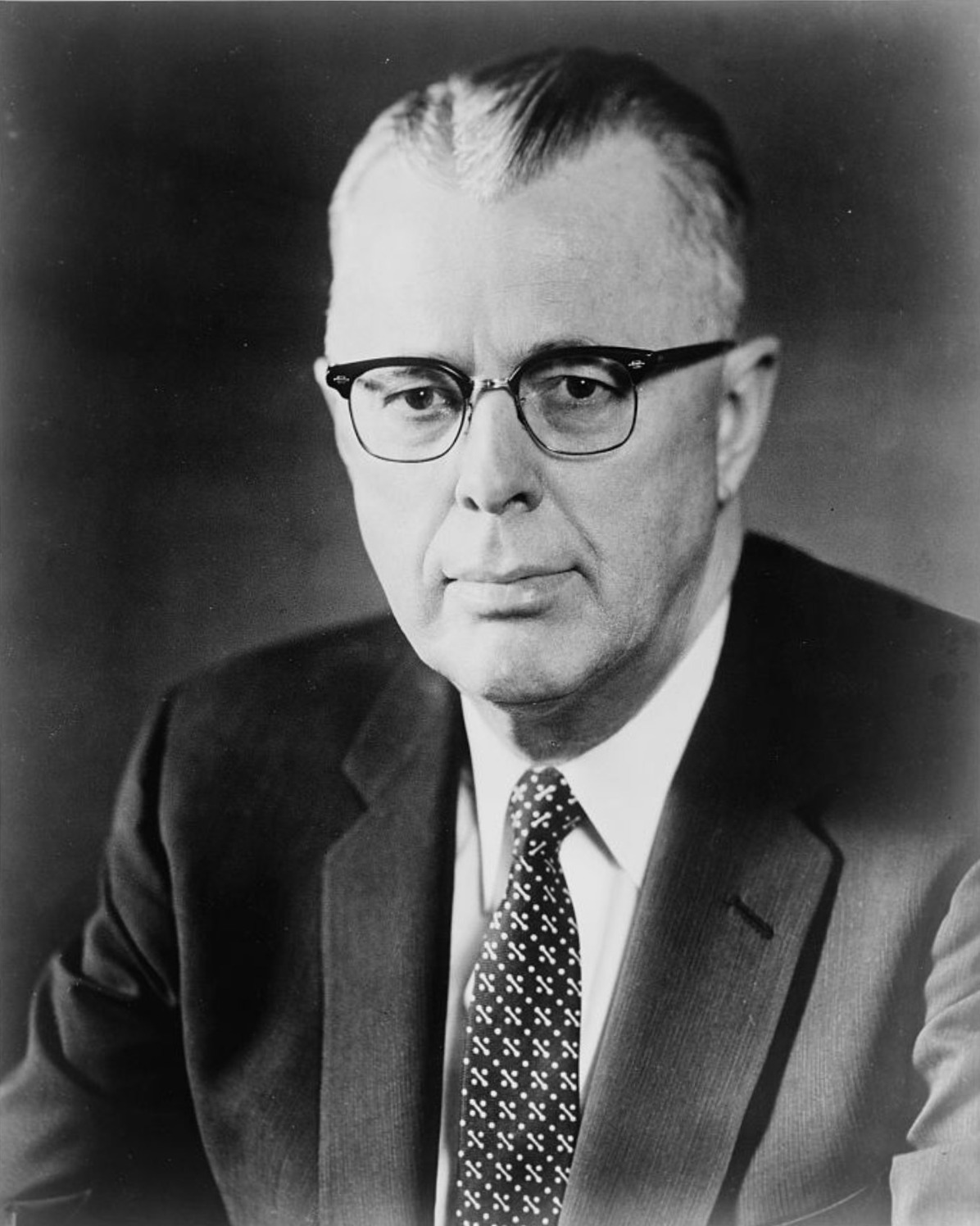
Norris Cotton

- Wayne G. Borah (1910) – federal judge
- Horatio Colony (1918) – poet and novelist
- J. Ira Courtney (1910) – Olympic sprinter and baseball player (1912)
- Allen Dulles (1910) – U.S. director of Central Intelligence
- Rustin McIntosh (1910) – pediatrician
- Edwin Charles Parsons (1910) – rear admiral of the United States Navy
- Olin M. Jeffords (1911) – chief justice of the Vermont Supreme Court
- Robert Nathan (1912) – novelist and poet
- Phelps Putnam (1912) – poet
- Donald Ogden Stewart (1912) – Academy Award-winning screenwriter, The Philadelphia Story
- Harold Weston (1912) – modernist painter
- William D. Byron (1913) – U.S. representative from Maryland
- Hunt Wentworth (circa 1913) –socialite and businessman
- Harry Worthington (1913) – Olympic long jumper (1912)
- John Amen (1914) – prosecutor of government corruption, head of the U.S. Interrogation Division at the Nuremberg Trials
- Amos N. Blandin, Jr. (1914) – Supreme Court justice, State of New Hampshire
- Arthur Freed (1914) – film producer
- Howard Hawks (1914) – film director
- Joseph Frank Wehner (1914) – fighter pilot
- Charles Bierer Wrightsman (c. 1914) – fine arts collector and philanthropist
- Art Braman (1915) – NFL football player
- Eddie Casey (1915) – All-American football player; head coach of the Washington Redskins
- Richard F. Cleveland (1915) – son of President Grover Cleveland; civil servant
- Lawrence Dennis (1915) – author and economist
- Louis M. Loeb (1915) – president of the New York City Bar Association
- Drew Pearson (1915) – newspaper reporter, author, columnist
- Stephen Potter (1915) – first American naval aviator to shoot down a German seaplane
- Nathaniel Wollf (1916?) – Harvard student implicated in the Secret Court of 1920
- John Cowles Sr. (1917) – co-owner of the Cowles Media Company
- Frederick Cunningham (1917) – Olympic fencer (1920)
- Werner Janssen (1917) – conductor and composer
- Donold Lourie (1917) – All-American football player; businessman; government official
- Cyril Wilcox (1917) – Harvard student implicated in the Secret Court of 1920
- Frederick James Woodbridge (1917) – architect
- Robert B. Chiperfield (1918) – U.S. representative from Illinois
- Jocko Conlon (c. 1918) – professional baseball player (did not graduate)
- George H. Love (1918) – businessman; industrialist; coal baron; chairman of the board of Chrysler
- Francis T. P. Plimpton (1918) – lawyer and diplomat
- Norris Cotton (1919) – U.S. representative from New Hampshire; U.S. senator from New Hampshire
- Haddie Gill (1919) – pitcher for Cincinnati Reds
- David Granger (1919) – Olympic bobsledder (1928–silver medal)
- Donald Oenslager (1919) – Tony Award-winning scenic designer
- Phra Bisal Sukhumvit (1919) – Thai chief of Department of Highways, urban planner
- Lewis Compton (1910s), Assistant Secretary of the Navy

=== 1920s ===
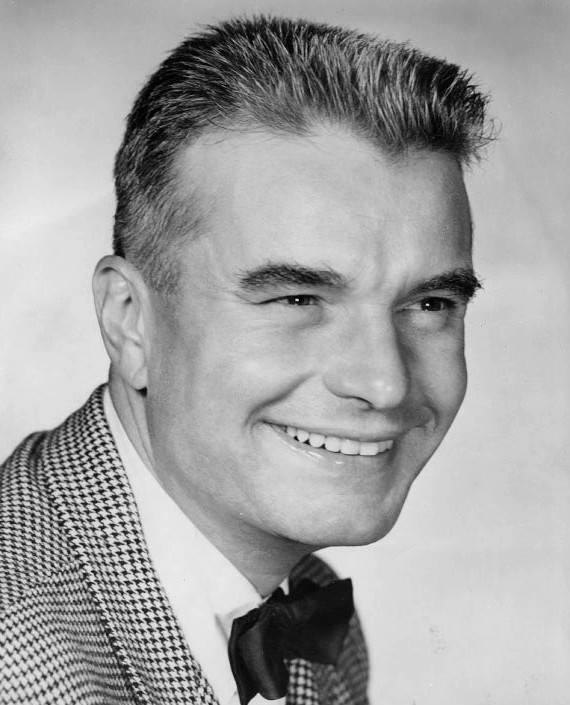
Kent Smith

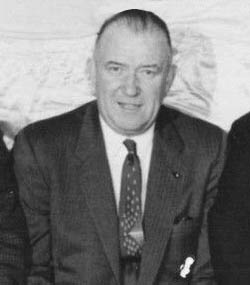
Walter A. Brown

- James Tinkham Babb (1920) – librarian and book collector
- Mark Brunswick (c. 1920) – composer
- Corliss Lamont (1920) – humanist and civil libertarian
- Jess Sweetser (1920) – amateur golfer
- Herb Treat (1920) – All-American football player; player-coach of the Boston Bulldogs
- C. Bradford Welles (1920) – classicist
- James Greenway (1921) – ornithologist
- Richard Luman (1921) – All-American football player; speaker of the Wyoming House of Representatives
- Laurence Stoddard (1921) – Olympic coxswain (1924–gold medal)
- Weston Adams (c. 1922) – principal owner and president of the Boston Bruins
- Montgomery Atwater (1922) – pioneer in avalanche research and forecasting; author
- Robert Todd Lincoln Beckwith (1922) – great-grandson of Abraham Lincoln
- Bayes Norton (1922) – Olympic sprint runner (1924)
- Laurence Duggan (1923) – head of the South American desk at the United States Department of State; Soviet spy
- Jarvis Hunt (c. 1923) – 79th president of Massachusetts Senate
- Charles Edward Wyzanski Jr. (1923) – federal judge
- John Chase (1924) – Olympic ice hockey player (1932–silver medal)
- Howard Francis Corcoran (1924) – federal judge
- Sidney Darlington (1924) – engineer and inventor; winner of the Presidential Medal of Freedom
- John F. "Jack" Hasey (1924) – officer in the French Foreign Legion; CIA officer; officer in the Légion d'honneur
- Tracy Jaeckel (1924) – Olympic fencer (1932–bronze medal, 1936)
- George E. Kimball (1924) – professor of quantum chemistry
- John H. H. Phipps (1924) – businessman, conservationist, philanthropist, champion polo player
- William Saltonstall (1924) – principal of Phillips Exeter, 1946–1963
- Edmund Berkeley (1925) – computer scientist; author
- John K. Fairbank (1925) – academic and historian of China
- Lincoln Kirstein (1925) – writer; co-founder and general director of the New York City Ballet (did not graduate)
- Dwight Macdonald (1925) – author and critic
- Richard B. Sewall (1925) – Yale English professor; biographer
- Kent Smith (c. 1925) – actor
- Walworth Barbour (1926) – U.S. ambassador to Israel
- Walter A. Brown (1926) – original owner of the Boston Celtics, owner of the Boston Bruins
- Richard W. Leopold (1926) – historian at Northwestern University
- Red Rolfe (1927) – All-Star New York Yankee third baseman, manager of the Detroit Tigers
- James Agee (1928) – author and critic
- Morton Bartlett (1928) – sculptor and photographer
- Jack R. Howard (1928) – broadcasting executive
- Albert E. Kahn (1928) – blacklisted journalist and photographer
- Tex McCrary (1928) – journalist, radio and television talk-show innovator, political "fixer"
- Hart Day Leavitt (1928) – longtime English teacher, Phillips Academy, Andover, Massachusetts
- Hickman Price (1928) – business executive; U.S. assistant secretary of Commerce
- Paul Sweezy (1928) – economist and publisher
- Whiting Willauer (1928) – U.S. ambassador to Honduras and Costa Rica
- Robert H. Bates (1929) – instructor in English, PEA; mountaineer
- H. Hamilton "Hammy" Bissell (1929) – long-time director of scholarships at the academy; uncle of John Irving (1961)
- Edwin Gillette (1929) – cameraman, inventor of animation technique
- Sam Knox (c. 1929) – guard for the Detroit Lions
- William Ernest Gillespie (1929) – interim principal of Phillips Exeter Academy
- William Howard Stein (1929) – Nobel Prize winner in Chemistry, 1972
- Henry Babcock Veatch (1929) – neo-Aristotelian philosopher

=== 1930s ===
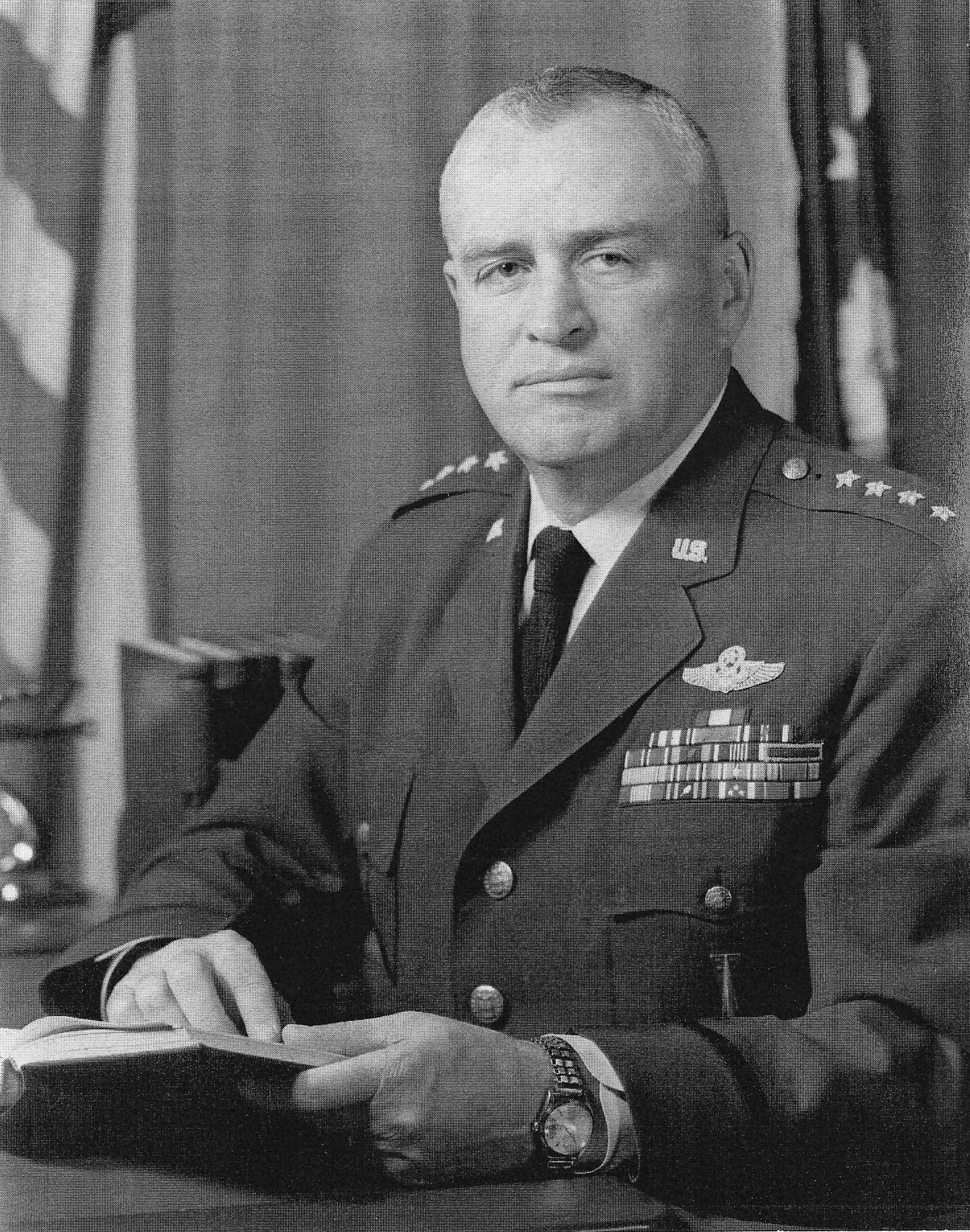
William H. Blanchard

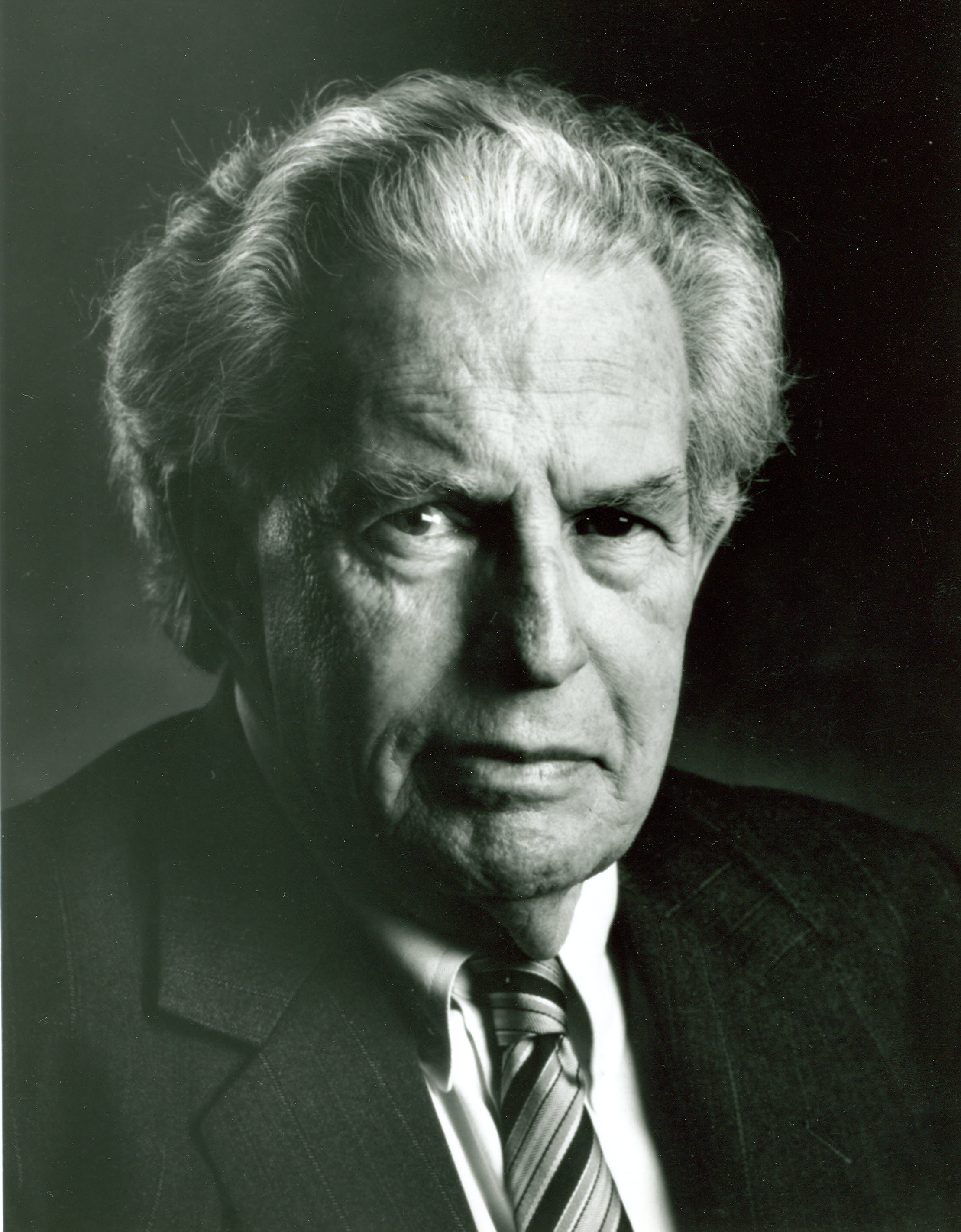
Richard Walker Bolling

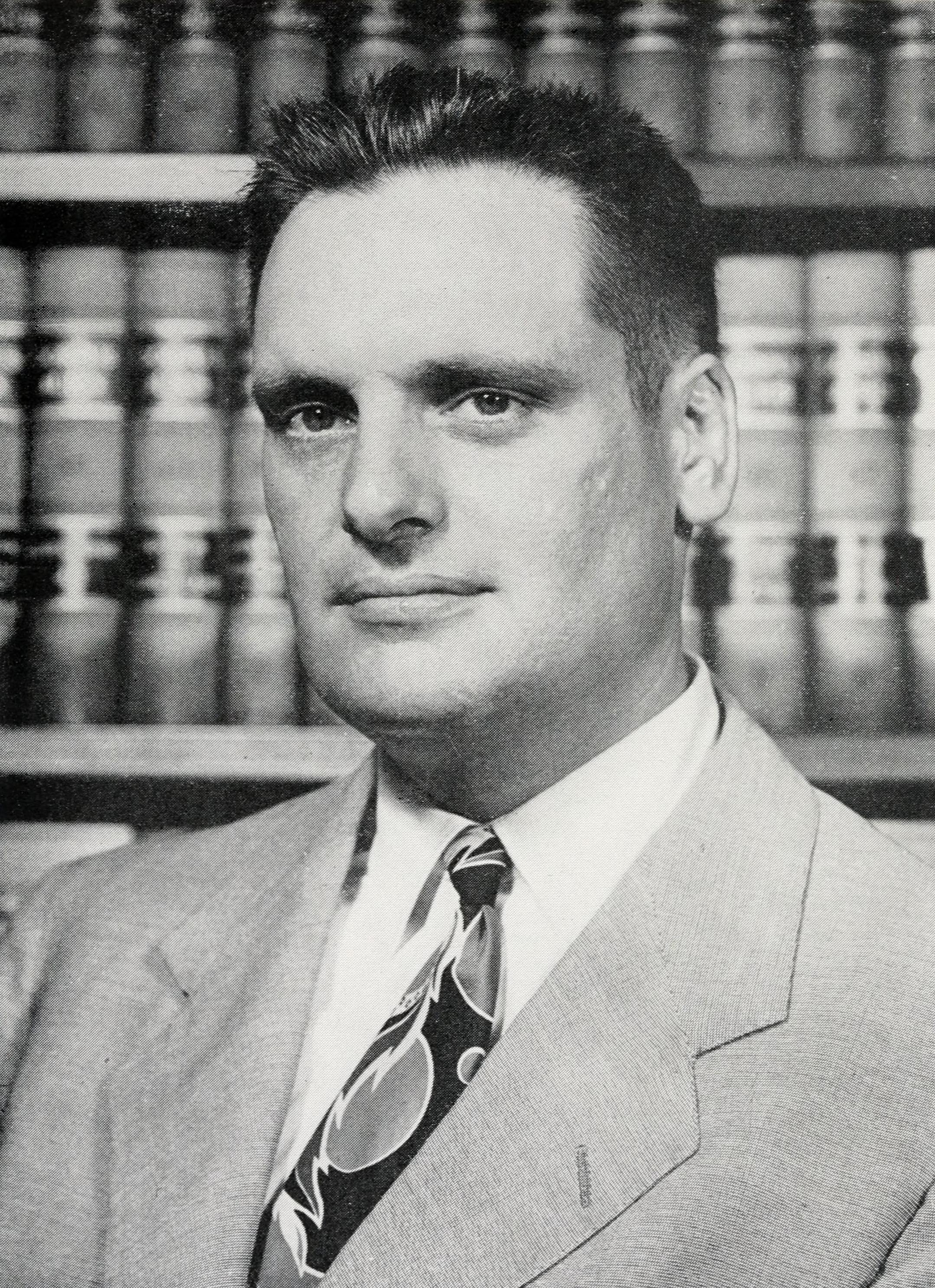
Hugh Gregg

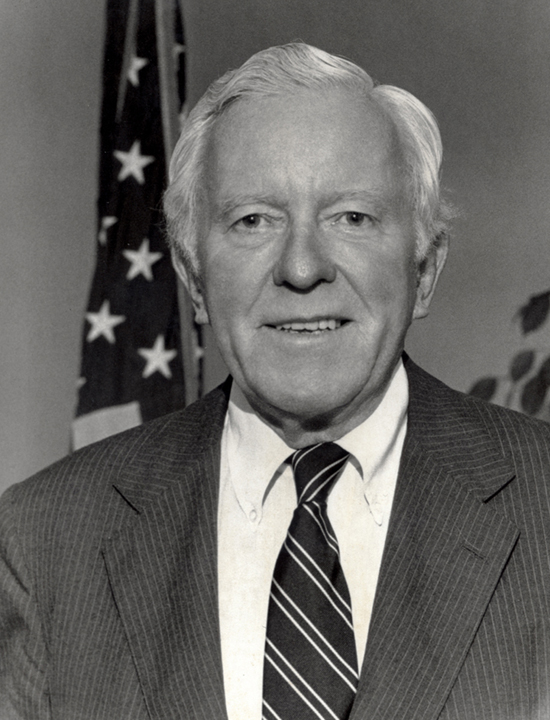
William Verity Jr.

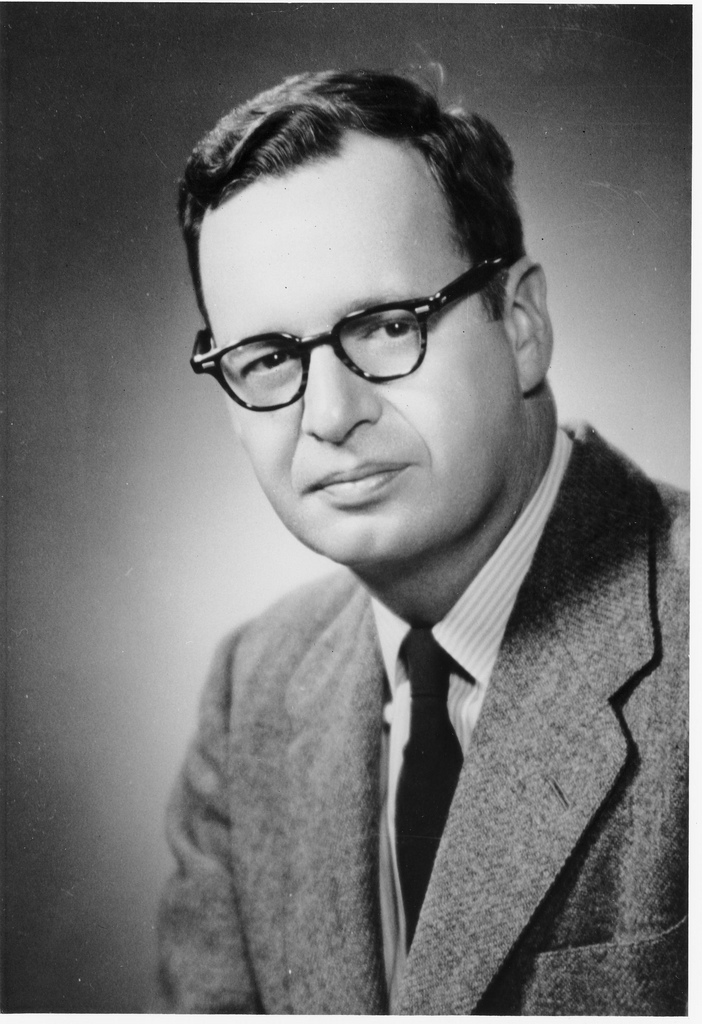
Douglas Knight

- Joseph H. Burchenal (1930) – oncologist; winner of the Lasker Award
- John A. M. Hinsman (1930) – president of the Vermont State Senate
- Francis Spain (1930) – captain of the 1936 U.S. Olympic hockey team (bronze medal)
- Eliot Butler Willauer (1930) – architect
- Larry Bogart (1931) – critic of nuclear power
- Macdonald Carey (1931) – film and television actor, winner of two Emmy Awards
- John Crosby (1931) – newspaper columnist, media critic, suspense novelist
- George Haskins (1931) – law professor at the University of Pennsylvania Law School
- Richard S. Salant (1931) – president of CBS News
- Sonny Tufts (1931) – film and television actor
- Bruce H. Billings (1932) – physicist
- Richard Pike Bissell (1932) – author and playwright, winner of Tony Award (The Pajama Game)
- Germain Glidden (1932) – national squash champion, painter, muralist, cartoonist and founder of the National Art Museum of Sport
- Milton Green (1932) – world record holder in the high hurdles; boycotted 1936 Olympics
- John Toland (1932) – Pulitzer Prize-winning historian (The Rising Sun)
- Adolph Coors III (1933) – businessman
- Richard Dorson (1933) – "father of American folklore"
- Arthur M. Schlesinger Jr. (1933) – historian
- Charles E. Tuttle (1933) – publisher
- Robert Livingston Allen (1934) – linguist, developer of Sector Analysis
- Nathaniel Benchley (1934) – author, screenwriter
- William H. Blanchard (1934) – four-star general, vice chief of staff of the United States Air Force
- Richard Walker Bolling (c. 1934) – U.S. representative from Missouri (did not graduate)
- William Coors (c. 1934) – CEO, Coors Brewing Company
- Gordon Kay (1934) – movie producer
- Thomas P. Whitney (1934) – diplomat, author, translator, philanthropist
- Robert W. Anderson (1935) – playwright
- Elkan Blout (1935) – inventor; biochemist; awarded National Medal of Science
- R. W. B. Lewis (1935) – literary scholar and critic
- Tom Slick (c. 1935) – inventor and businessman
- Joseph Coors (1935) – CEO, Coors Brewing Company
- David D. Furman (1935) – New Jersey attorney general, New Jersey Superior Court judge
- Hugh Gregg (1935) – governor of New Hampshire, father of Senator Judd Gregg (1965)
- David Hall (c. 1935) – recorded sound archivist
- William Verity Jr. (c. 1935) – U.S. Secretary of Commerce
- James T. Aubrey (c. 1936) – president of CBS and MGM
- Alfred D. Chandler Jr. (1936) – business historian
- Thomas Clinton (1936) – executive of Deutsche Bank, philanthropist, early advocate of the formation of the Presbyterian Church
- Calvin Plimpton (1936) – physician, president of Amherst College
- George M. Prince (c. 1936) – co-creator of synectics
- Robert Samuel Salzer (1936) – vice admiral of the United States Navy
- John Tyler Bonner (c. 1937) – biologist
- Lee Parsons Gagliardi (1937) – federal judge
- Nelson Gidding (1937) – screenwriter
- Douglas Knight (1937) – president of Duke University
- Alfred A. Knopf Jr. (1937) – co-founder of Atheneum Publishers
- Daniel E. Koshland Jr. (1937) – biochemist; editor of Science
- Charles Mergendahl (1937) – novelist, playwright, television scriptwriter
- Robert H. B. Baldwin (1938) – undersecretary of the Navy; chairman and president of Morgan Stanley
- Lex Barker (1938) – actor
- T. Clark Hull (1938) – lieutenant governor of Connecticut; Connecticut Supreme Court justice
- Nicholas Katzenbach (1938) – U.S. attorney general; vice-president of IBM; father of John Katzenbach (1968)
- Alexander Saxton (c. 1938) – historian, novelist, and university professor
- Arthur A. Seeligson Jr. (1938) – oilman, rancher, thoroughbred racehorse owner and breeder
- Sloan Wilson (1938) – author (did not graduate)
- Forman S. Acton (1939) – computer scientist
- Alfred Atherton (1939) – U.S. ambassador to Egypt
- Ward Chamberlin (1939) – public broadcasting executive
- John Holt (1939) – educational critic, activist, and author

=== 1940s ===
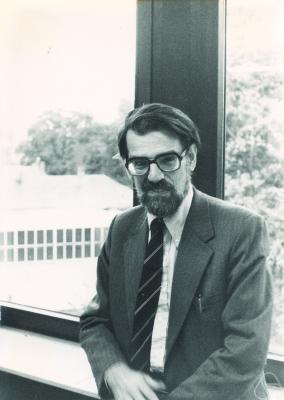
Lloyd Shapley

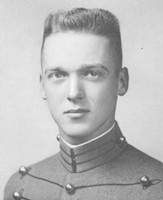
Robert B. Rheault

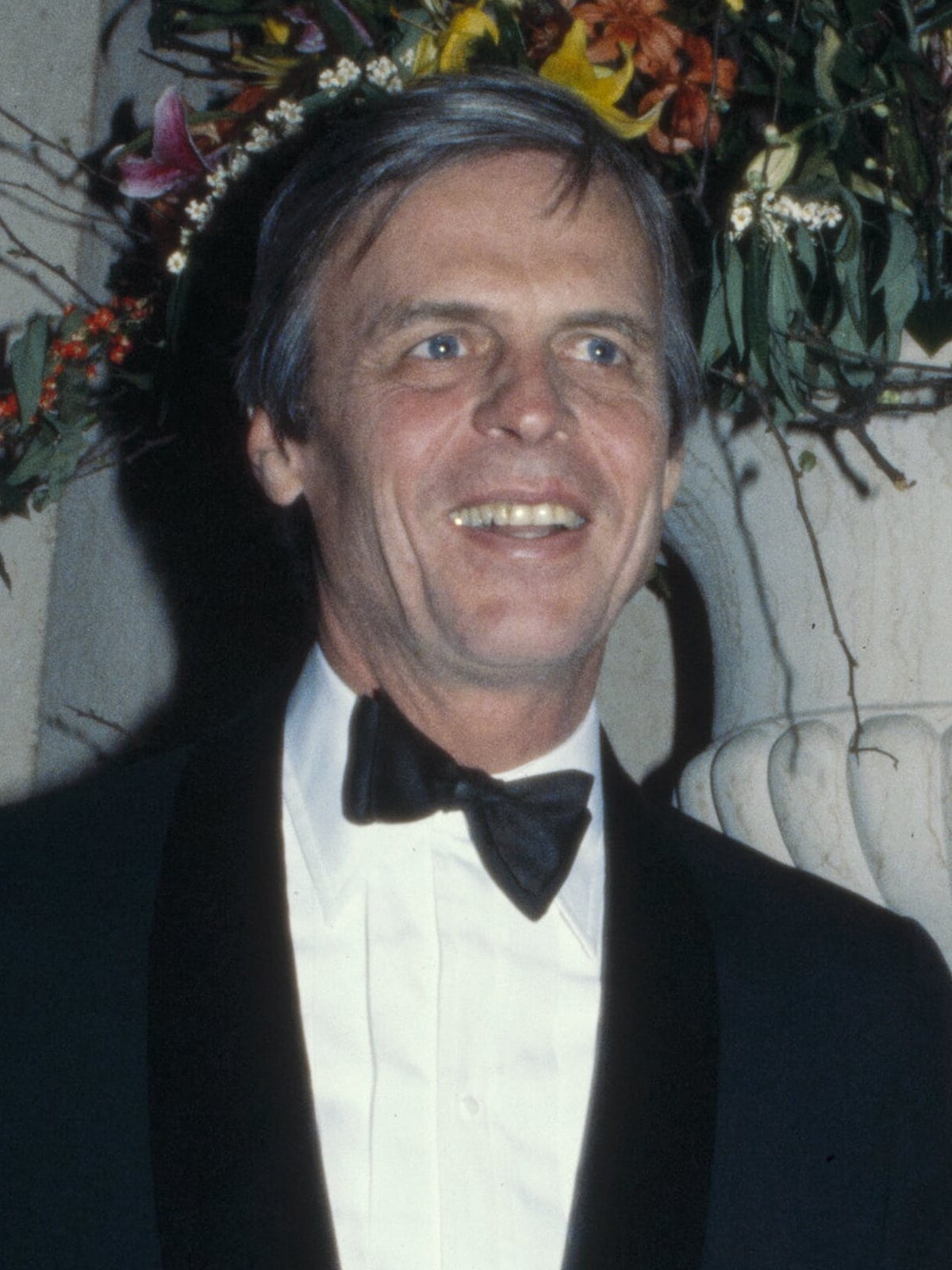
George Plimpton

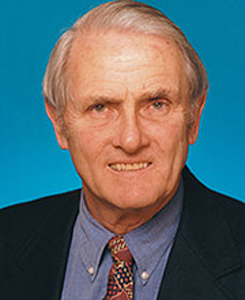
James R. Lilley

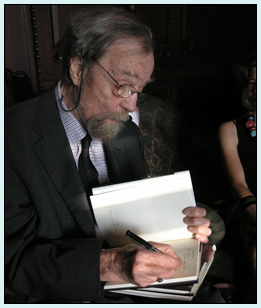
Donald Hall

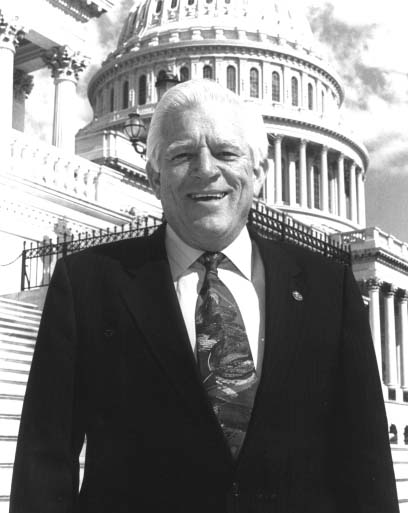
Carlos Romero Barceló

- George Christopher Archibald (1940) – British economist
- William J. Conklin (c. 1940) – architect, archeologist; designer of United States Navy Memorial, co-designer of Reston, Virginia
- Lloyd L. Duxbury (c. 1940) – speaker of the Minnesota House of Representatives
- Burke Marshall (1940) – U.S. assistant attorney general; head of the Civil Rights Division of the United States Department of Justice during the civil rights era
- Bud Palmer (1940) – professional basketball player (NY Knicks); jump shot pioneer; sportscaster; New York City Commissioner of Public Events
- Lloyd Shapley (1940) – winner of the 2012 Nobel Prize in Economics
- Harold R. Tyler Jr. (1940) – federal judge
- William C. Campbell (1941) – two-time president of the USGA; member of the World Golf Hall of Fame
- Neil MacNeil (1941) – journalist
- Anton Myrer (1941) – author of war novels
- Robert B. Choate Jr. (1942) – businessman and political activist
- Nathaniel Davis (1942) – career diplomat, U.S. ambassador to Guatemala, Chile, and Switzerland
- William Bell Dinsmoor Jr. (1942) – classical archaeologist and architectural historian
- Thomas Ashley Graves Jr. (1942) – president of the College of William & Mary
- Lloyd Stephen Riford Jr. (1942) – New York State politician
- Bagley Wright (1942) – developer; investor; arts patron and fine art collector
- John G. King (1943) – physicist
- Roberts Bishop Owen (1943) – U.S. State Department legal advisor and diplomat
- Robert B. Rheault (1943) – U.S. military officer; conspirator in the Green Beret Affair; inspiration for Apocalypse Now
- Frederic M. Richards (1943) – biochemist and biophysicist
- Julian Roosevelt (1943) – Olympic sailor (1948, 1952–gold medal, 1956, 1960, 1968, 1972)
- Roger Sonnabend (1943) – hotelier and businessman
- John Thomson (1943) – UK high commissioner to India; UK ambassador to the UN
- Gore Vidal (1943) – author
- Whitney Balliett (1944) – writer for The New Yorker
- Willis Barnstone (1944) – poet, memoirist, translator
- Robinson O. Everett (1944) – judge and law professor
- Kenneth W. Ford (1944) – physicist
- George Plimpton (1944) – author, editor, journalist, actor (expelled)
- Henry N. Cobb (1944) – architect and founding partner of Pei Cobb Freed & Partners
- John Glenn Beall Jr. (1945) – U.S. representative from Maryland; U.S. senator from Maryland
- James P. Gordon (1945) – invented the Maser as a graduate student at Columbia University with Charles H. Townes (who was later awarded the Nobel Physics prize in 1964)
- Fred Kingsbury (1945) – Olympic rower (1948–bronze medal)
- John Knowles (1945) – author, A Separate Peace
- James R. Lilley (1945) – U.S. ambassador to China
- William E. Schluter – New Jersey politician
- Charles W. Bailey II (1946) – political reporter, newspaper editor, political novelist (Seven Days in May)
- Theodore V. Buttrey Jr. (1946) – numismatist
- Michael Forrestal (1946) – government aide, legal advisor
- Will Holt (c. 1946) – singer, songwriter, librettist, lyricist
- Ramsay MacMullen (1946) – professor of history at Yale University
- Wallace Nutting (1946) – four-star general
- F. D. Reeve (1946) – author, poet, translator, editor
- Cervin Robinson (1946) – architectural photographer
- Robert L. Belknap (c. 1947) – scholar of Russian literature and dean at Columbia University
- John Cowles Jr. (1947) – newspaper editor and publisher; philanthropist
- Bill Felstiner (1947) – socio-legal scholar
- Donald Hall (1947) – poet; U.S. Poet Laureate, 2006–2007
- Richard W. Murphy (1947) – diplomat; U.S. ambassador to Mauritania, Syria, the Philippines, and Saudi Arabia
- Glenn D. Paige (1947) – political scientist
- John Pittenger (c. 1947) – lawyer and academic
- Haviland Smith (1947) – CIA station chief
- Herbert P. Wilkins (1947) – chief justice of the Massachusetts Supreme Judicial Court
- David Bevington (1948) – literary scholar
- Douglas M. Head (1948) – attorney general of Minnesota
- Frederic B. Ingram (1948) – businessman
- Alan Trustman (1948) – screenwriter (The Thomas Crown Affair, Bullitt, They Call Me Mr. Tibbs)
- Don Whiston (1948) – Olympic ice hockey player (1952–silver medal)
- Carlos Romero Barceló (1949) – governor of Puerto Rico, Resident Commissioner of Puerto Rico to the U.S. House of Representatives
- Adair Dyer (1949) – attorney, passed the International Family Law through the Supreme Court
- Bo Goldman (1949) – screenwriter (One Flew Over the Cuckoo's Nest, Scent of a Woman), winner of two Academy Awards
- Albert L. Hopkins (1949) – computer designer
- Thomas P. Hoving (1949) – museum director, author, publisher (expelled; graduated from Hotchkiss School)
- John Kerr (1949) – actor
- James Smith (1949) – Olympic sport shooter (1956)

=== 1950s ===
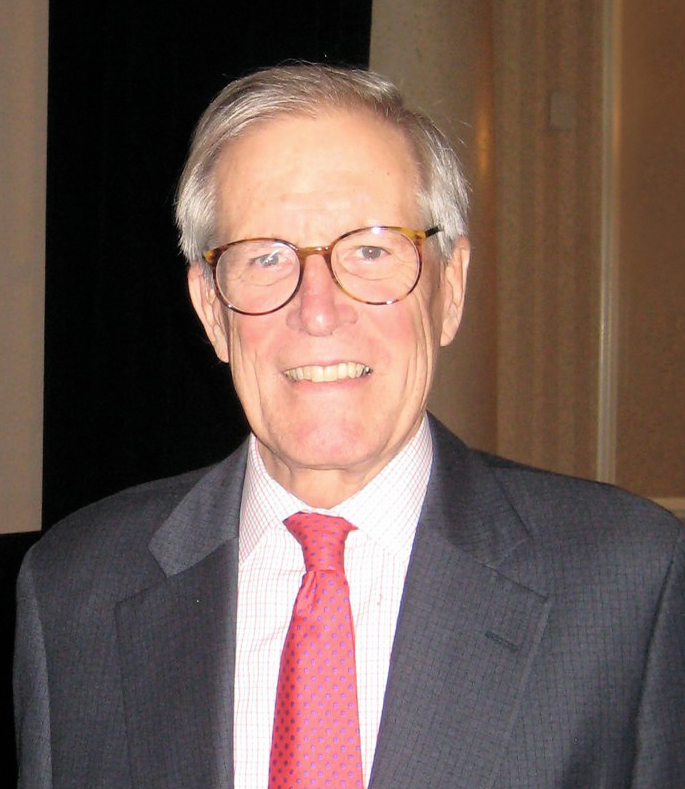
Pierre S. du Pont IV

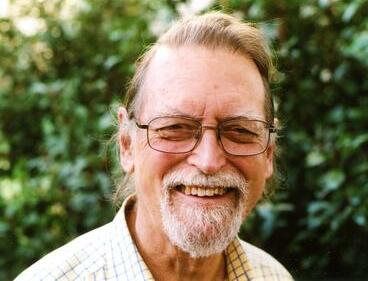
David Mumford

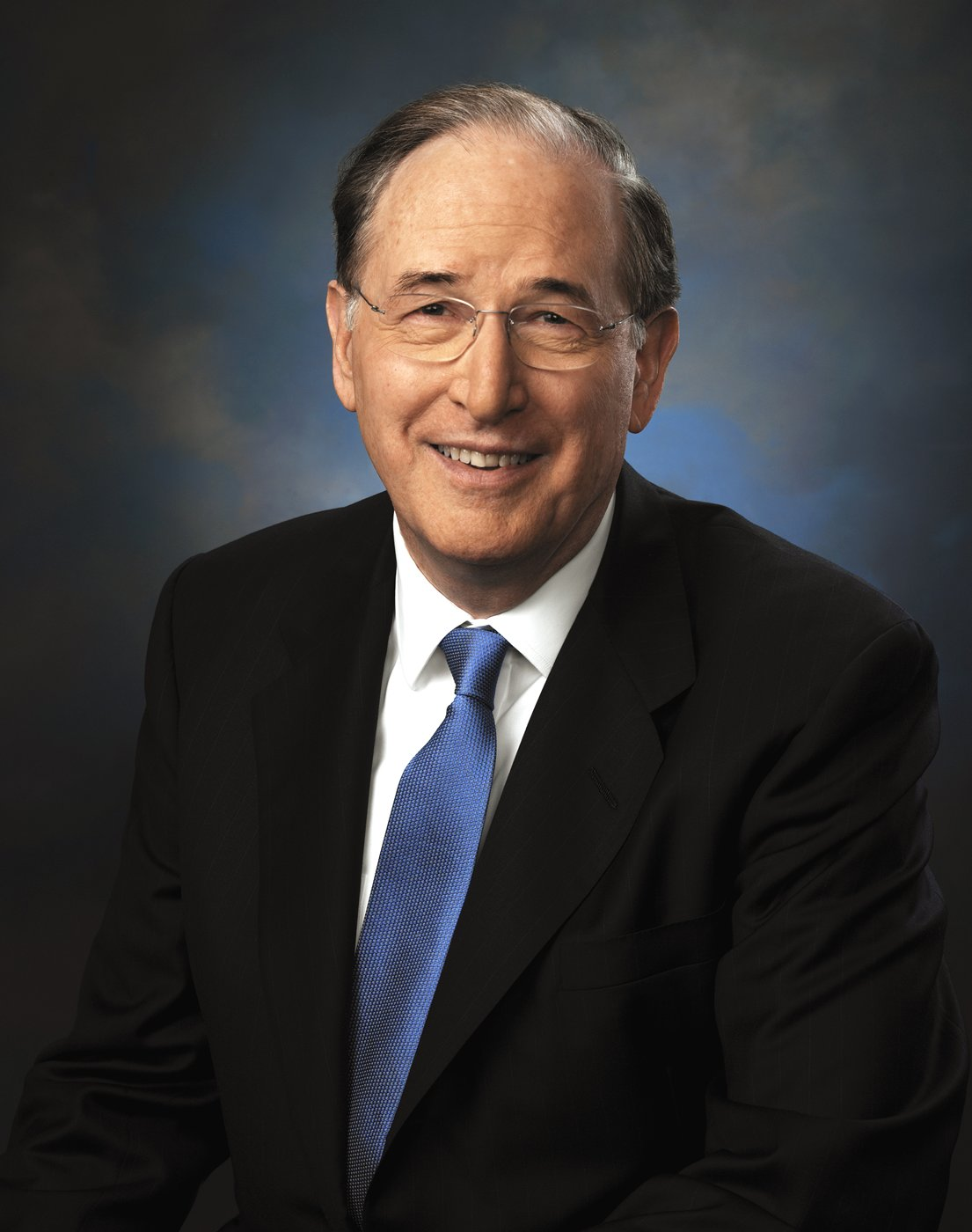
Jay Rockefeller

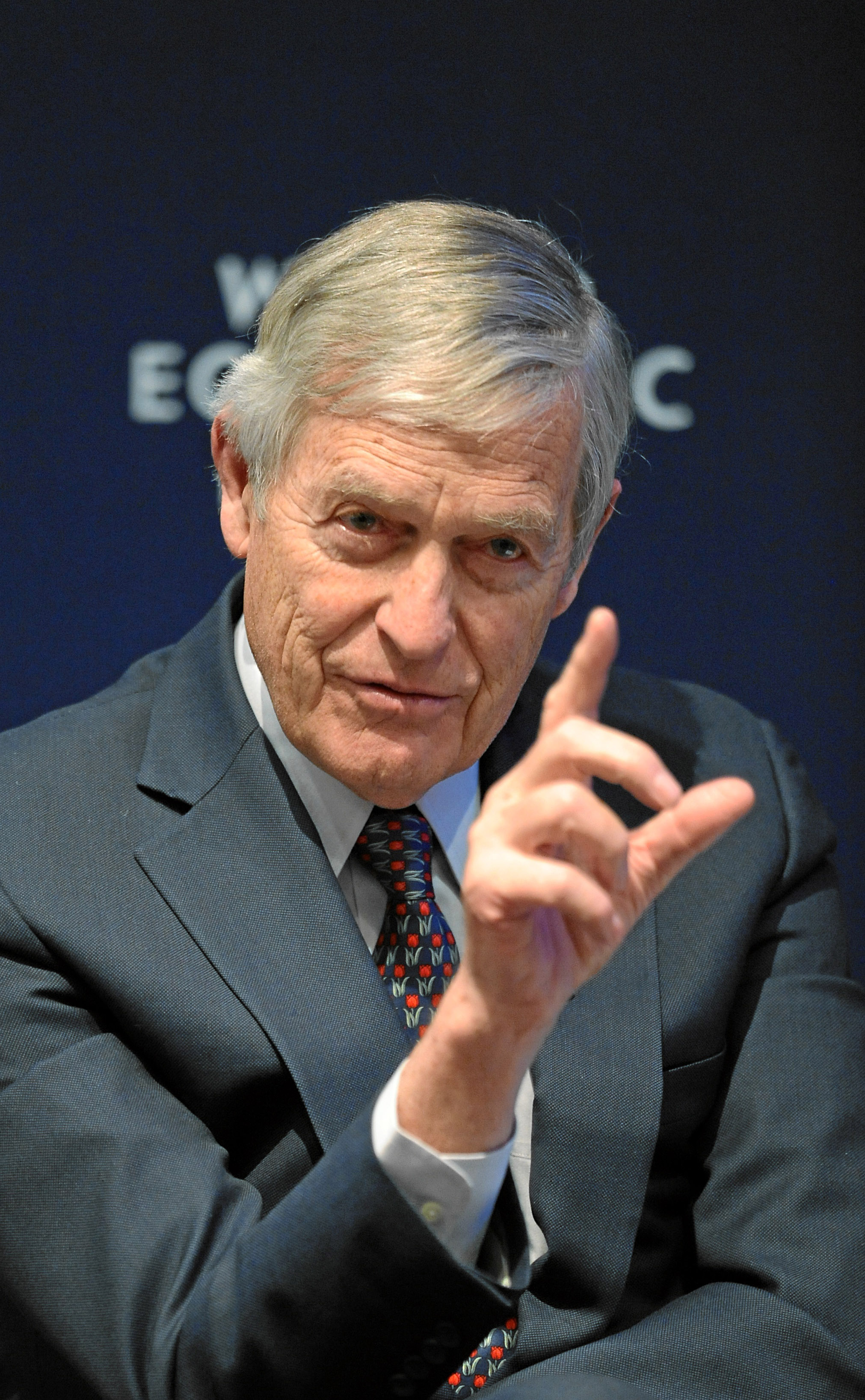
Tim Wirth

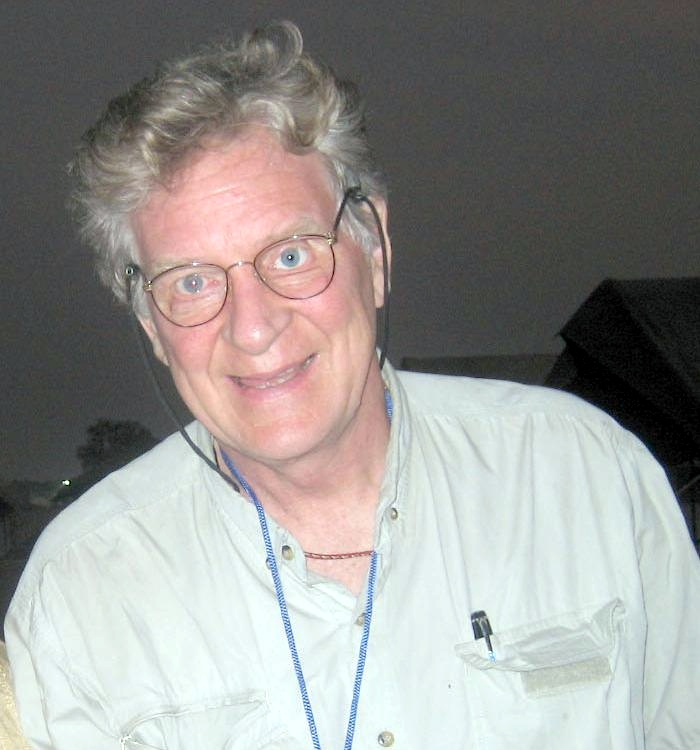
Robert Thurman

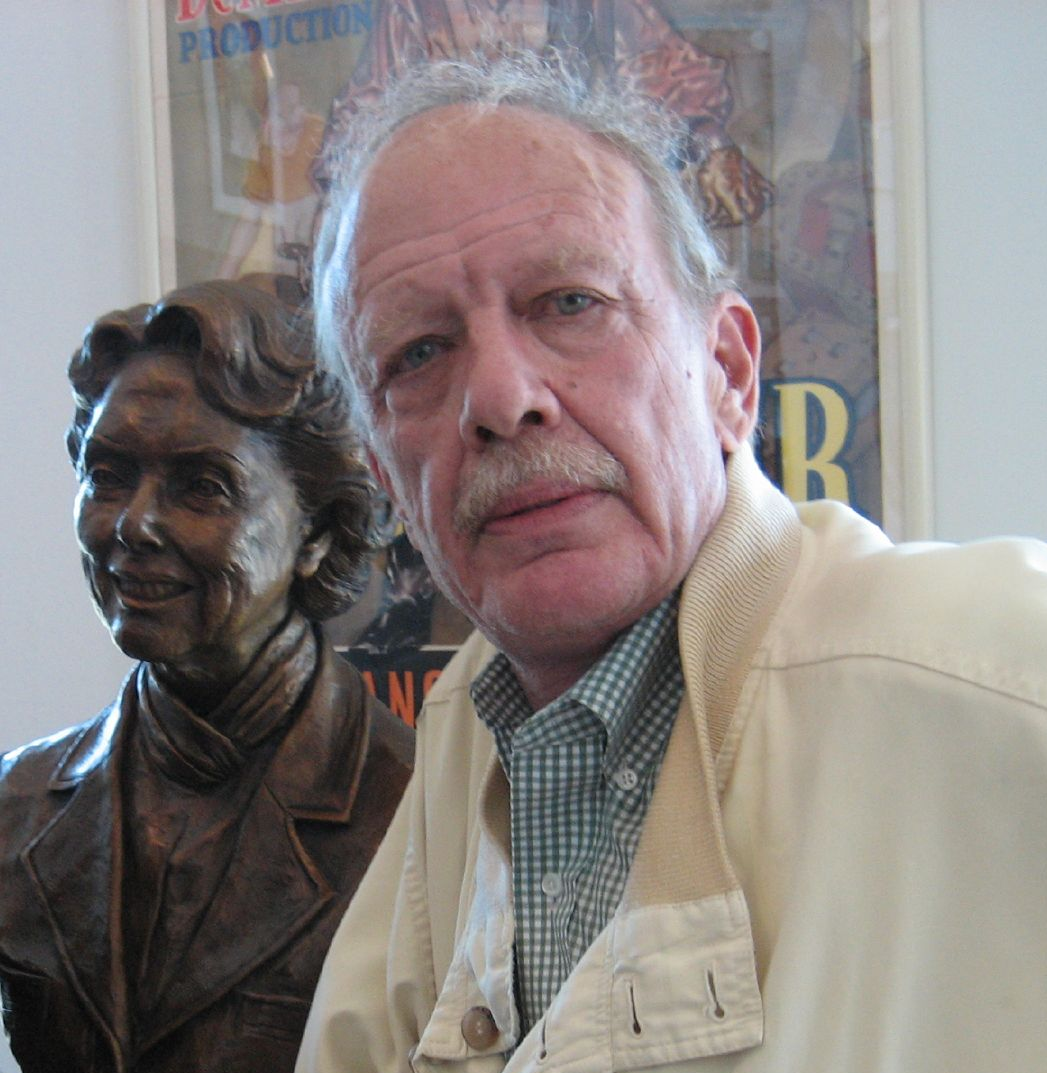
Tom Mankiewicz

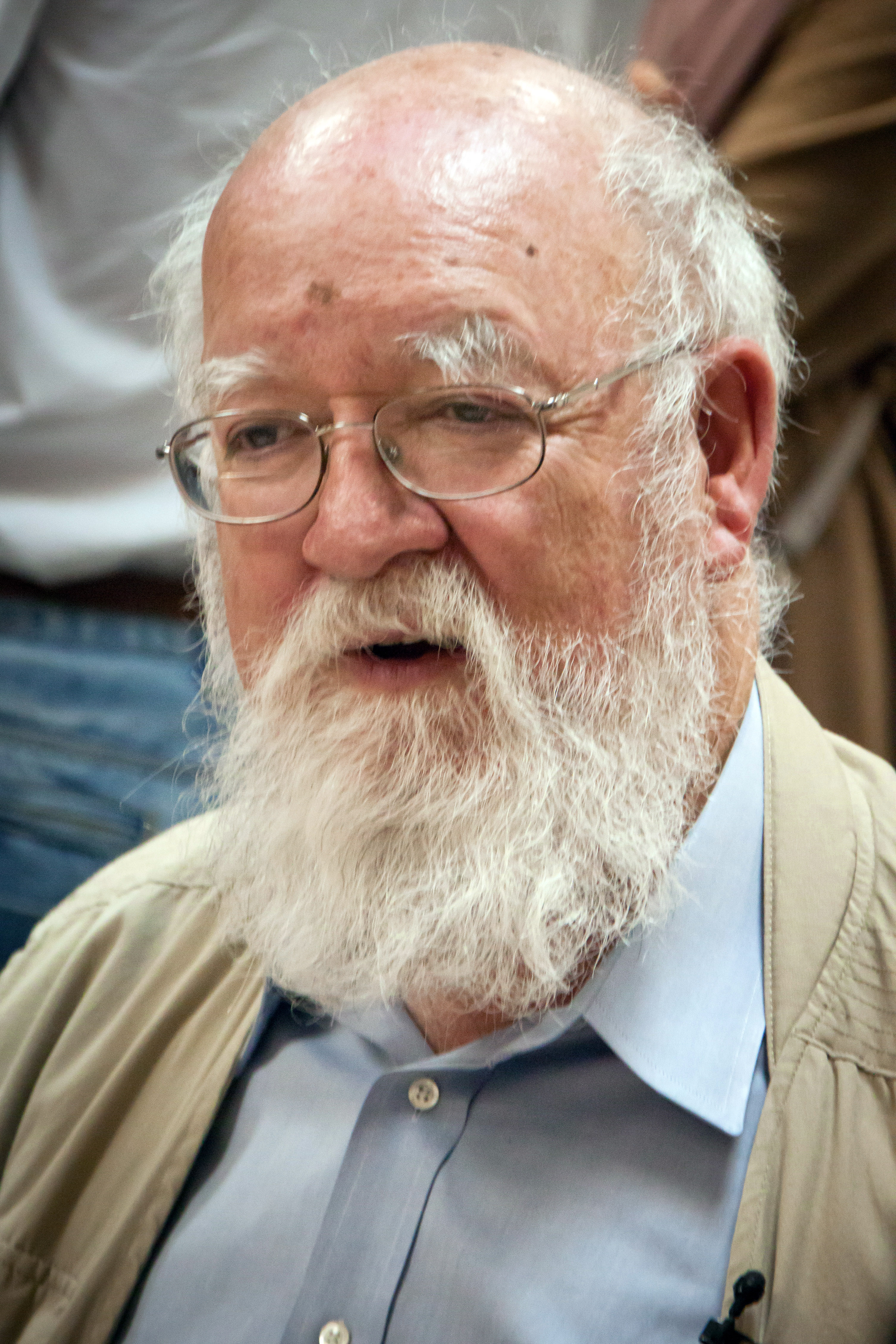
Daniel Dennett

- Bill Briggs (1950) – "father of extreme skiing;" member U.S. National Ski and Snowboard Hall of Fame
- Tom Corcoran (1950) – Olympic alpine skier (1956, 1960); four-time U.S. national champion alpine skier
- M. Scott Peck (c. 1951) – psychiatrist; author (did not graduate)
- George Eman Vaillant (1951) – psychiatrist
- Walter Darby Bannard (1952) – abstract painter and University of Miami professor
- Robert Cowley (1952) – military historian
- Pierre S. du Pont IV (1952) – U.S. representative from Delaware, governor of Delaware
- Thomas Ehrlich (1952) – president of Indiana University
- Cyrus Hamlin (1952) – literary critic and theorist
- Harmon Elwood Kirby (1952) – career diplomat; ambassador to Togo
- Karl Ludvigsen (1952) – automotive journalist, author, historian, and design consultant
- David Mumford (1952) – mathematician; winner of the Fields Medal; Macarthur Fellow
- Robert D. Richardson (1952) – historian and biographer
- Harold Russell Scott Jr. (1952) – Broadway actor and director
- David Wight (1952) – Olympic rower (1956–gold medal)
- Robert G. Wilmers (1952) – businessman
- Richard S. Arnold (1953) – judge of the United States Court of Appeals for the Eighth Circuit; namesake of federal courthouse in Little Rock
- Hodding Carter III (1953) – assistant secretary of state for Public Affairs
- Michael von Clemm (1953) – businessman, restaurateur, anthropologist
- Bud Konheim (1953) – businessman
- Earl J. Silbert (1953) – prosecutor in Watergate case
- Robert C. Wetenhall (1953) – owner of the Montreal Alouettes football club
- Jonathan Aldrich (1954) – poet
- William Becklean (1954) – Olympic rower (1956–gold medal)
- Peter B. Bensinger (1954) – administrator of the Drug Enforcement Administration
- T. Alan Broughton (1954) – poet
- Michael Z. Hobson (c. 1954) – executive vice president of Marvel Comics
- James F. Hoge Jr. (1954) – editor of Foreign Affairs
- Christopher Jencks (1954) – sociologist
- David Merwin (1954) – Olympic sprint canoer (1956)
- Robert Morey (1954) – Olympic rower (1956–gold medal)
- George Beall (1955) – prosecutor of Vice President Spiro Agnew
- G. Bradford Cook (1955) – chairman of the U.S. Securities and Exchange Commission
- Charles D. Ellis (1955) – investment consultant; author; founder of Greenwich Associates
- John Gager (1955) – professor of religion at Princeton University
- Richard Maltby Jr. (1955) – theater producer, director, and lyricist; screenwriter; crossword puzzle creator
- John D. "Jay" Rockefeller IV (1955) – governor of West Virginia; U.S. senator from West Virginia
- Peter Sears (1955) – Poet Laureate of Oregon
- Tom Whedon (1955) – television screenwriter
- Phil Wilson (c. 1955) – jazz trombonist
- Gordon Park Baker (1956) – American-English philosopher
- William Bayer (1956) – crime fiction writer
- Stewart Brand (1956) – editor, author, Internet pioneer
- H. John Heinz III (1956) – U.S. representative from Pennsylvania; U.S. senator from Pennsylvania
- Dennis Johnson (1956) – composer, mathematician
- J. Vinton Lawrence (1956) – CIA operative; caricaturist
- Theodore Stebbins (1956) – art historian
- John Negroponte (1956) – U.S. ambassador to Honduras, Mexico, the Philippines, United Nations, and Iraq; U.S. deputy secretary of state, the first director of National Intelligence
- Peter Benchley (1957) – journalist, presidential speechwriter, author, screenwriter (Jaws)
- Peter Georgescu (1957) – author, chairman emeritus of Young & Rubicam
- Bill Keith (1957) – banjo innovator
- Herbert Kohler Jr. (1957) – businessman (did not graduate)
- Terry Lenzner (1957) – lawyer
- Tim Wirth (1957) – U.S. representative from Colorado; U.S. senator from Colorado; current head of the United Nations Foundation
- John Winslow Bissell (1958) – judge for the United States District Court for the District of New Jersey
- Don Briscoe (1958) – television actor
- George Gilder (1958) – writer and co-founder of the Discovery Institute
- Warren Hoge (1958) – reporter, bureau chief, and editor at The New York Times (did not graduate)
- David Lamb (1958) – reporter, bureau chief at The Los Angeles Times (did not graduate)
- George de Menil (1958) – French economist
- Stephen Robert (1958) – philanthropist and businessman, CEO of Oppenheimer & Co
- Robert Thurman (1958) – first American to be ordained a Buddhist monk in 1964; leading expert on Tibetan Buddhism
- John M. Walker Jr. (1958) – chief judge of the U.S. Court of Appeals for the Second Circuit
- David M. Eddy (1959) – physician
- Morris S. Arnold (1959) – judge on the United States Court of Appeals for the Eighth Circuit
- Daniel Dennett (1959) – philosopher
- Charles Janeway (1959) – immunologist
- Tom Mankiewicz (1959) – screenwriter, director, producer
- Hayford Peirce (1959) – writer
- Benno C. Schmidt Jr. (1959) – educator, president of Yale University
- Jan Schreiber (1959) – poet

=== 1960s ===
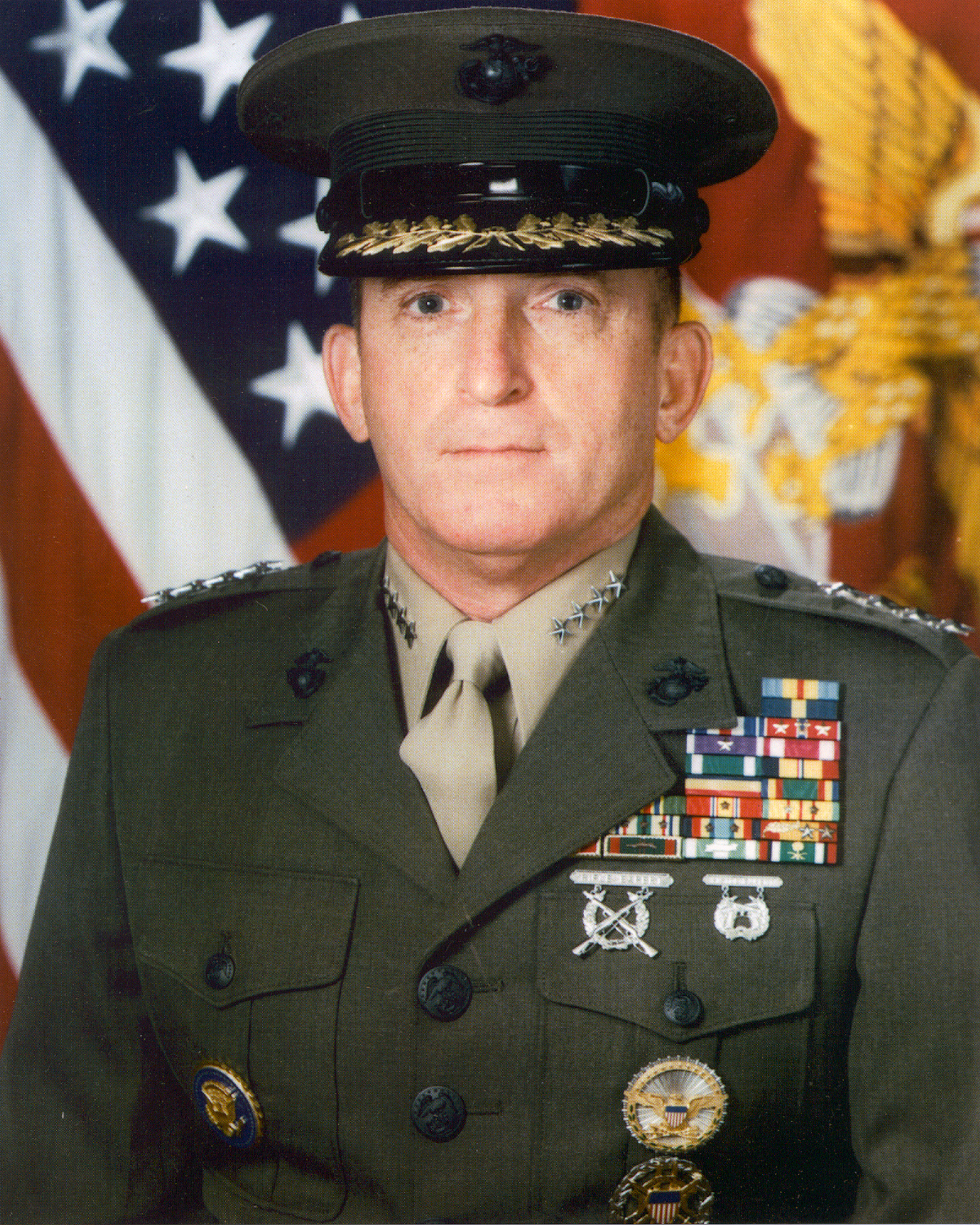
Charles C. Krulak

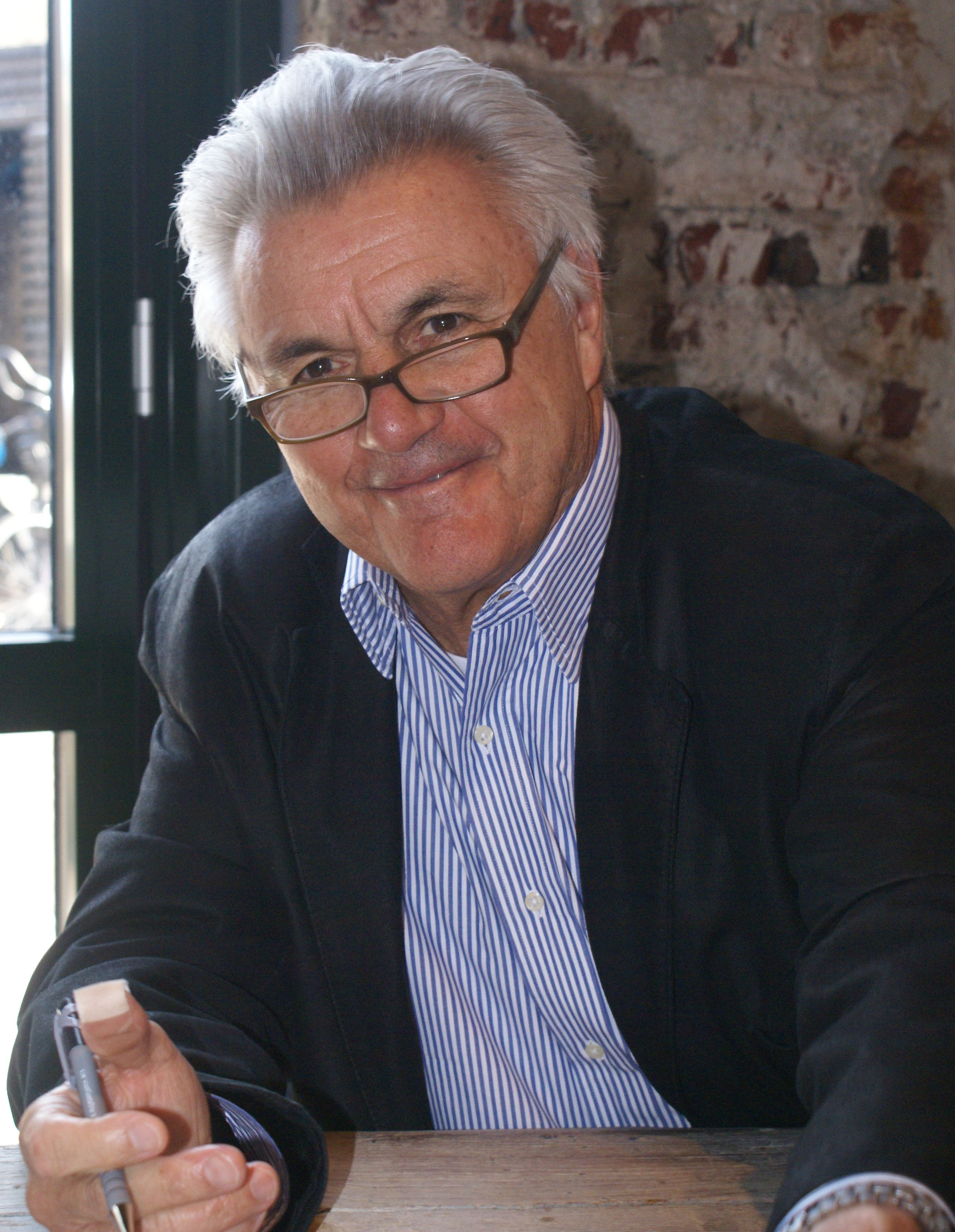
John Irving

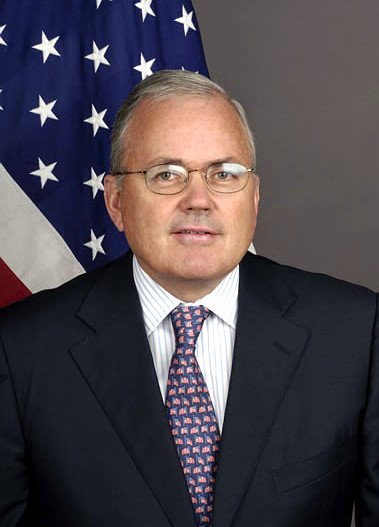
Craig Roberts Stapleton

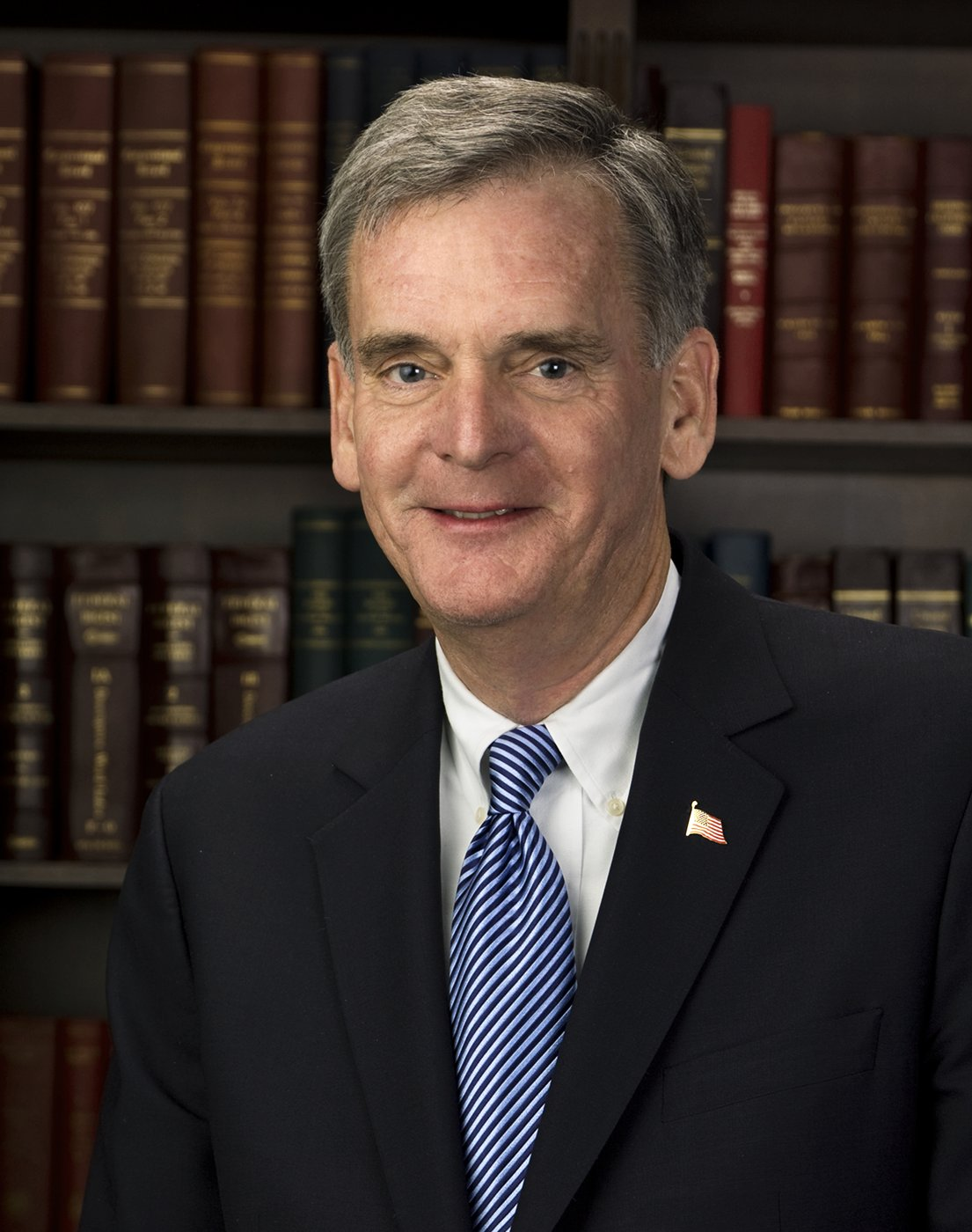
Judd Gregg

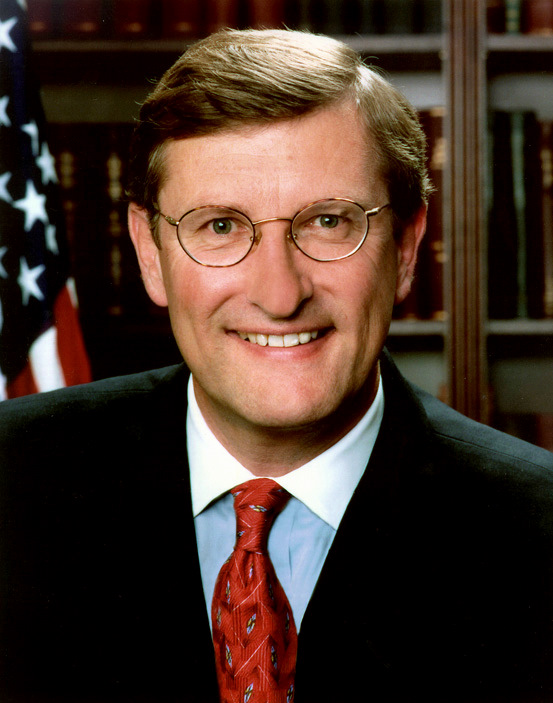
Kent Conrad

- Alvin P. Adams, Jr. (1960) – ambassador to Peru, Haiti, and Djibouti
- Robert Mehrabian (c. 1960) – materials scientist
- Charles Horman (1960) – journalist, victim of Chilean coup
- Charles C. Krulak (1960) – 31st Commandant of the U.S. Marine Corps
- Jerrold Speers (1960) – Maine state treasurer
- John Irving (1961) – author, The World According to Garp
- George W. S. Trow (1961) – novelist, playwright, short story writer, longtime contributor to The New Yorker
- Peter Simon (c. 1961) – actor
- Robert F. Wagner Jr. (1961) – deputy mayor of New York City; president of the New York City Board of Education
- Arthur K. Wheelock Jr. (1961) – curator of the Northern European Art Collection at the National Gallery of Art
- Kenneth Bacon (1962) – Department of Defense spokesman; president of Refugees International
- Evan A. Davis (1962) – president of the New York City Bar Association
- Chester E. Finn Jr. (1962) – educator; president of the Thomas B. Fordham Foundation
- Larry Hough (1962) – Olympic rower (1968–silver medal, 1972)
- Myron Magnet (1962) – conservative author, editor-at-large of City Journal
- Gregory B. Craig (1963) – attorney; assistant secretary of state; White House counsel; defended President Clinton in impeachment trial
- Gordon Gahan (1963) – photographer
- Craig Roberts Stapleton (1963) – U.S. ambassador to France and Czech Republic
- Willy Eisenhart (1964) – writer on art
- Paul Magriel (1964) – professional backgammon and poker player; author
- Peter Coors (1965) – president, Adolph Coors Brewing Co.
- David Darst (1965) – managing director, Morgan Stanley
- Barry Golson (c. 1965) – editor, journalist, author
- Terry Goddard (1965) – attorney general of Arizona; mayor of Phoenix
- Judd Gregg (1965) – U.S. representative from New Hampshire; governor of New Hampshire; U.S. senator from New Hampshire (withdrew as U.S. Commerce Secretary-designate)
- Helmut Panke (1965) – president, Bayerische Motoren Werke AG (BMW)
- Harrison "Skip" Pope Jr. (1965) – psychiatrist
- Charlie Smith (1965) – poet, novelist
- James Earl Coleman Jr. (1966) – attorney
- Kent Conrad (1966) – U.S. senator from North Dakota
- David Eisenhower (1966) – grandson of Dwight D. Eisenhower, 34th president of the United States; namesake of the Camp David presidential retreat
- Fred Grandy (1966) – actor; U.S. representative from Iowa; political commentator
- Steven T. Kuykendall (1966) – U.S. representative from California
- David Olney (1966) – folk singer/songwriter
- Mark Ethridge (1967) – Pulitzer Prize-winning journalist; novelist; screenwriter; publisher
- Jonathan Galassi (1967) – president and publisher of Farrar, Straus and Giroux; poet
- Curt Hahn (1967) – filmmaker
- Lawrence Lasker (1967) – producer and screenwriter of Sneakers
- Frank Teruggi (1967) – journalist
- Lincoln Caplan (1968) – author, journalist, Truman Capote Visiting Lecturer in Law and senior research scholar in law at Yale Law School
- Geoffrey Biddle (1968) – photographer
- Peter Galassi (1968) – curator
- Tom Birmingham (1968) – president of the Massachusetts Senate
- Edward Hallowell (1968) – psychiatrist
- John Katzenbach (1968) – author; son of Nicholas Katzenbach (1938)
- Jerome Karabel (1968) – scholar
- Thomas Lennon (1968) – documentary filmmaker
- Steve Mantis (1968) – Canadian politician
- Michael Fossel (1968) – editor of the Journal of Anti-Ageing Medicine
- Dowell Myers (1968) – professor
- Anthony Davis (1969) – composer and jazz pianist
- Peter W. Galbraith (1969) – diplomat, author, ambassador to Croatia (did not graduate)
- John C. Harvey Jr. (1969) – Admiral, US Navy; Commander US Fleet Forces Command; Chief of Naval Personnel/Deputy Chief of Naval Operations
- Christopher Kimball (1969) – founder of Cook's Illustrated; host of America's Test Kitchen
- Jack Gilpin (1969) – movie and television actor
- John McTiernan (1969) – filmmaker

=== 1970s ===
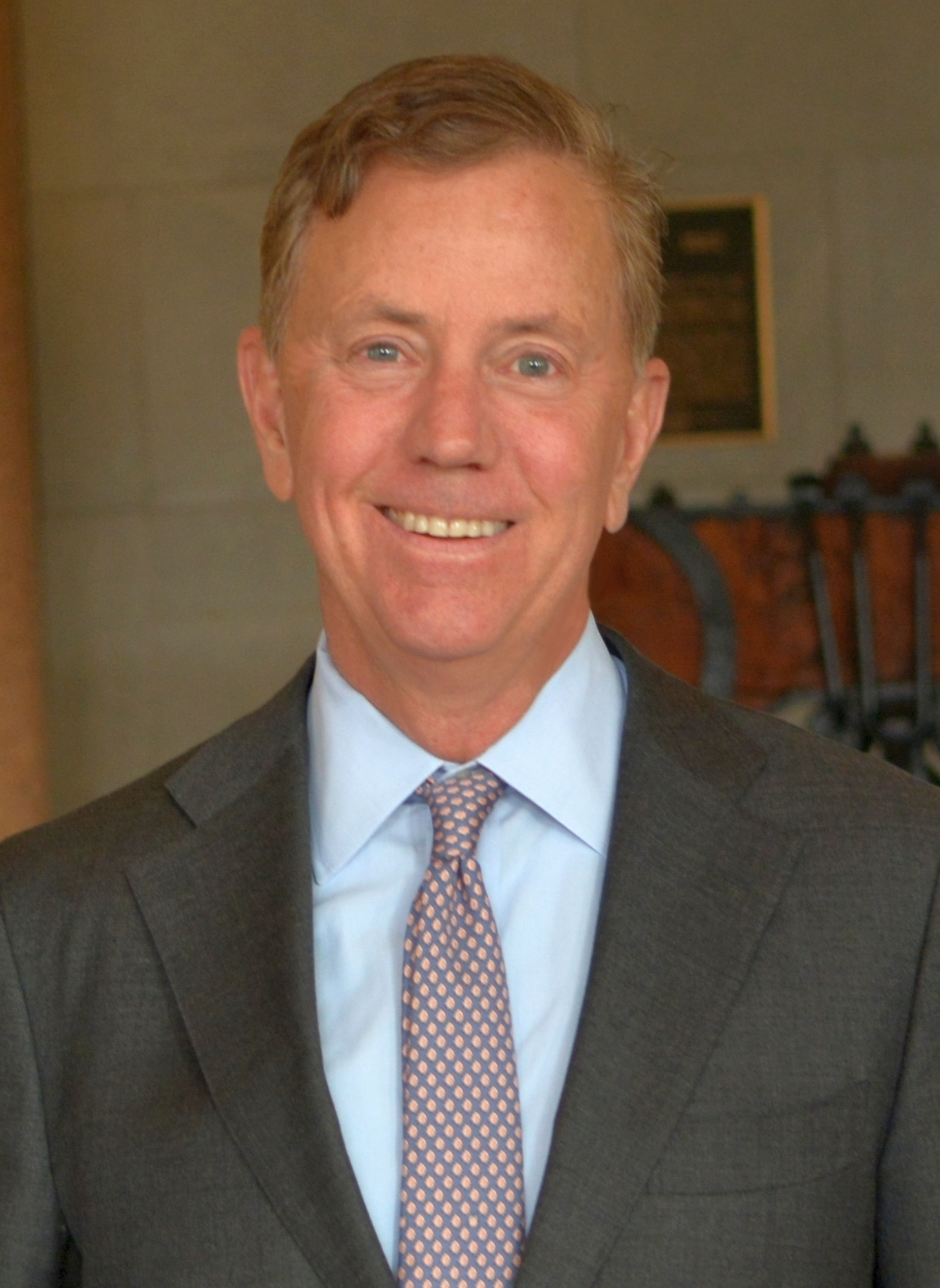
Ned Lamont

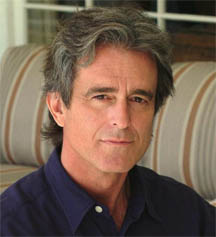
Bobby Shriver

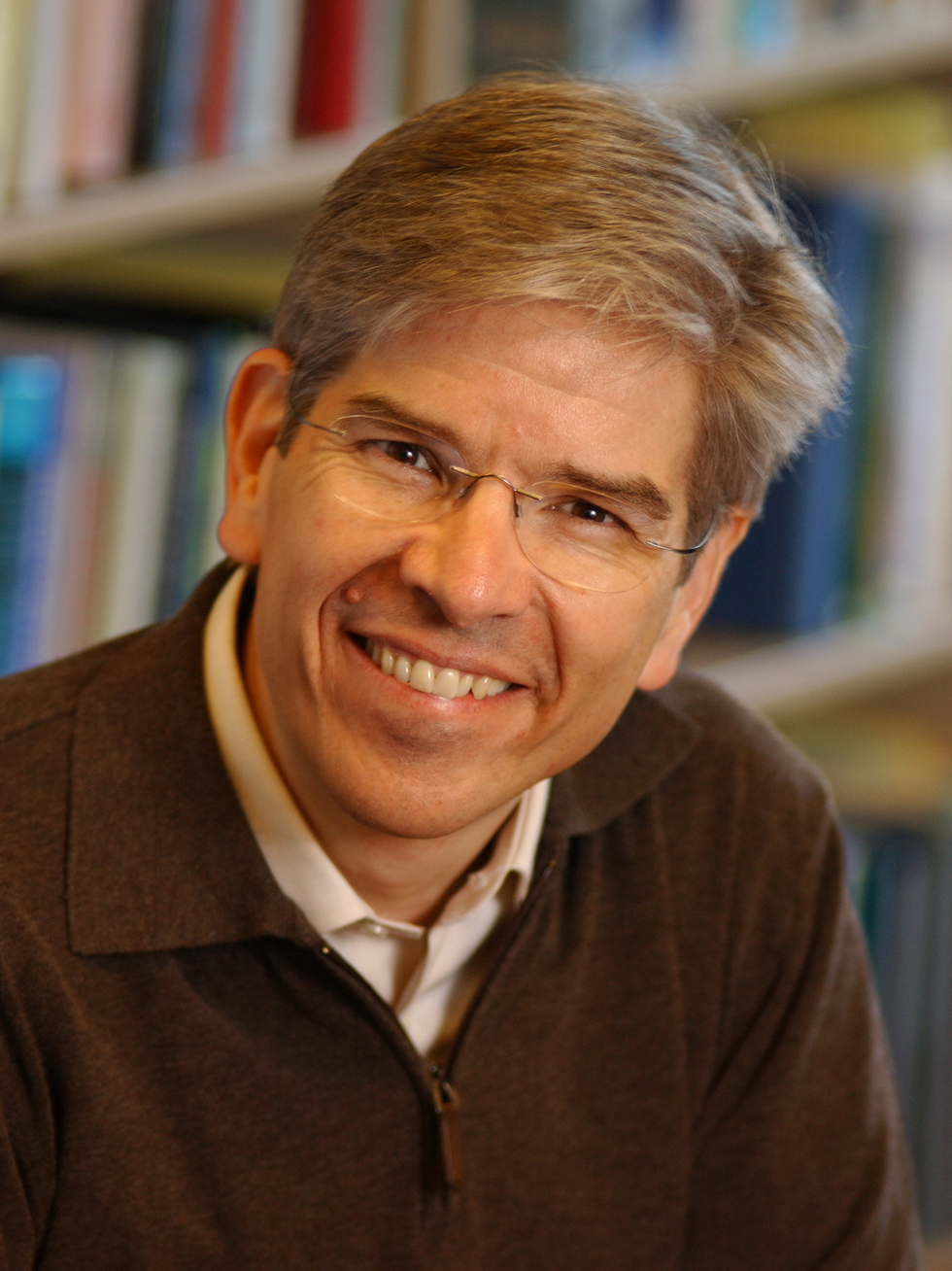
Paul Romer

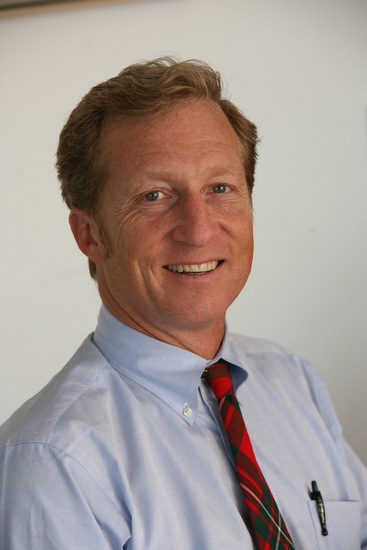
Tom Steyer

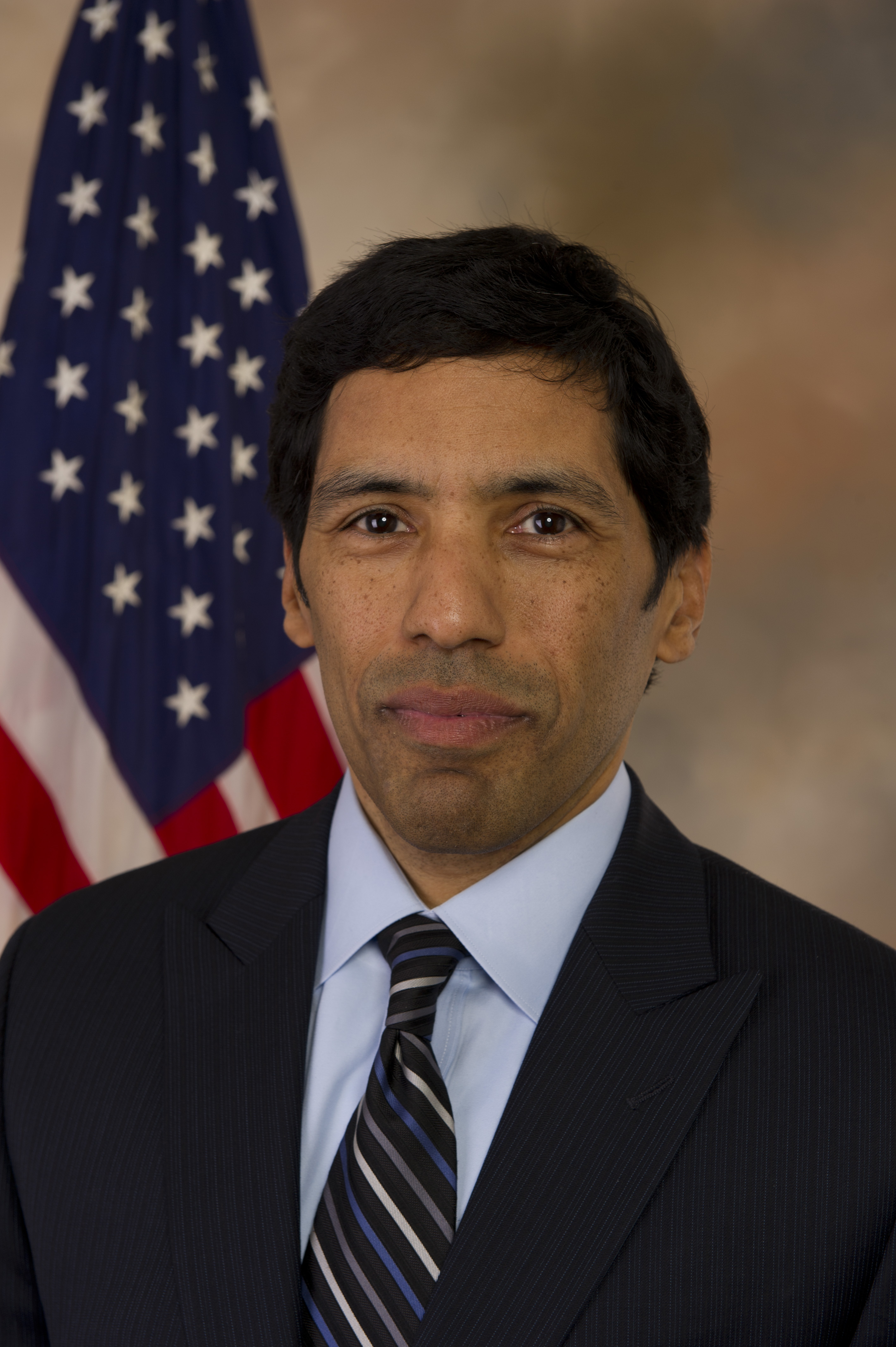
Hansen Clarke

- Robert Bauer (1970) – attorney, White House counsel
- Nicholas Callaway (1970) – publisher, television producer, writer, and photographer
- Scott McConnell (1970) – journalist
- Alex Beam (1971) – journalist, social critic
- Joyce Maynard (1971) – author
- Benmont Tench (1971) – musician and producer, keyboardist for Tom Petty
- Roland Merullo (1971) – author
- Banthoon Lamsam (1971) – banker
- Eben Alexander (1972) – neurosurgeon and author
- Howard Brookner (1972) – film director
- Robert J. Fisher (1972) – former chairman of the board, Gap, Inc.
- Shigehisa Kuriyama (1972) – historian of medicine
- Ned Lamont (1972) – businessman and politician; 89th governor of Connecticut
- W. Drake McFeely (1972) – chairman and president of W.W. Norton & Company
- Thomas G. Osenton (1972) – author; president, CEO, and publisher of The Sporting News Publishing Company
- Bobby Shriver (1972) – activist, attorney, journalist
- Eric Breindel (1973) – neoconservative writer, editorial page editor of the New York Post
- Rusty Magee (1973) – comedian, actor and composer/lyricist
- Paul Romer (1973) – chief economist of the World Bank, Nobel Prize winner in Economics, 2018
- Clayton Spencer (1973) – president of Bates College
- Paul Sullivan (1973) – pianist and composer
- Emery Brown (1974) – neuroscientist and anesthesiologist
- Andrew Holtz (1974) – journalist
- Stephen Mandel (1974) – hedge fund manager
- William S. Fisher (1975) – businessman and investor
- Alix M. Freedman (1975) – Pulitzer Prize-winning journalist
- Laurie Hays (1975) – Pulitzer Prize-winning journalist
- Joseph Lykken (1975) – physicist
- John O. McGinnis (1975) – legal theorist
- Brooks D. Simpson (1975) – author, historian
- Tom Steyer (1975) – asset manager, philanthropist, environmentalist, presidential candidate, 2020
- Ronald Chen (1976) – dean of Rutgers law school and advocate general for the State of New Jersey
- Anne Marden (1976) – Olympic rower (1984–silver medal, 1988–silver medal)
- Ginna Sulcer Marston (1976) – advertising director for the Partnership for a Drug Free America
- David McKean (1976) – author; U.S. ambassador to Luxembourg
- Norb Vonnegut (1976) – author
- James F. Conant (1977) – philosopher
- James Rubin (1977) – former US assistant secretary of state for Public Affairs (1997–2000)
- James Somerville (1977) – minister, First Baptist Church (Richmond, Virginia); former minister of First Baptist Church of Washington, DC
- Suzy Welch (1977) – journalist, author, and former editor of Harvard Business Review
- Catherine Disher (1978) – actress
- Mark Driscoll (1978) – Emmy Award-winning screenwriter
- Michael Lynton (1978) – CEO of Sony Entertainment Inc.
- Paul Villinski (1978) – sculptor (did not graduate)
- Michael Cerveris (1979) – Broadway and movie actor; winner of two Tony Awards
- John J. Fisher (1979) – majority owner of the Oakland Athletics
- Jonathan Smith (1979) – Olympic rower (1984–silver medal, 1984–bronze medal, 1992)
- Andrew Sudduth (1979) – Olympic rower (1984–silver medal, 1988)
- Hansen Clarke – U.S. representative from Michigan (did not graduate)
- William J. "Billy" Ruane Jr. – Boston area music promoter (did not graduate)

=== 1980s ===
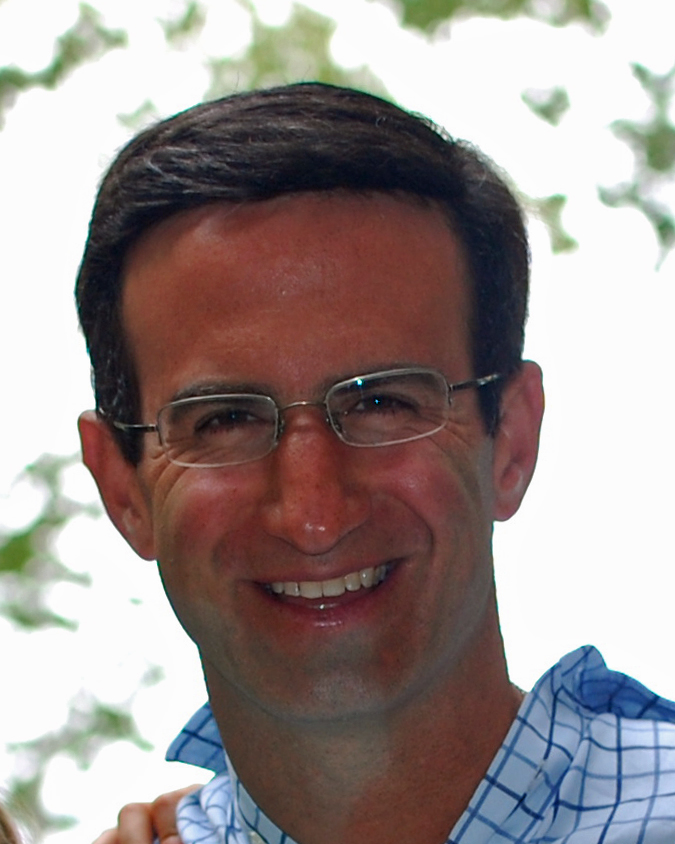
Peter R. Orszag

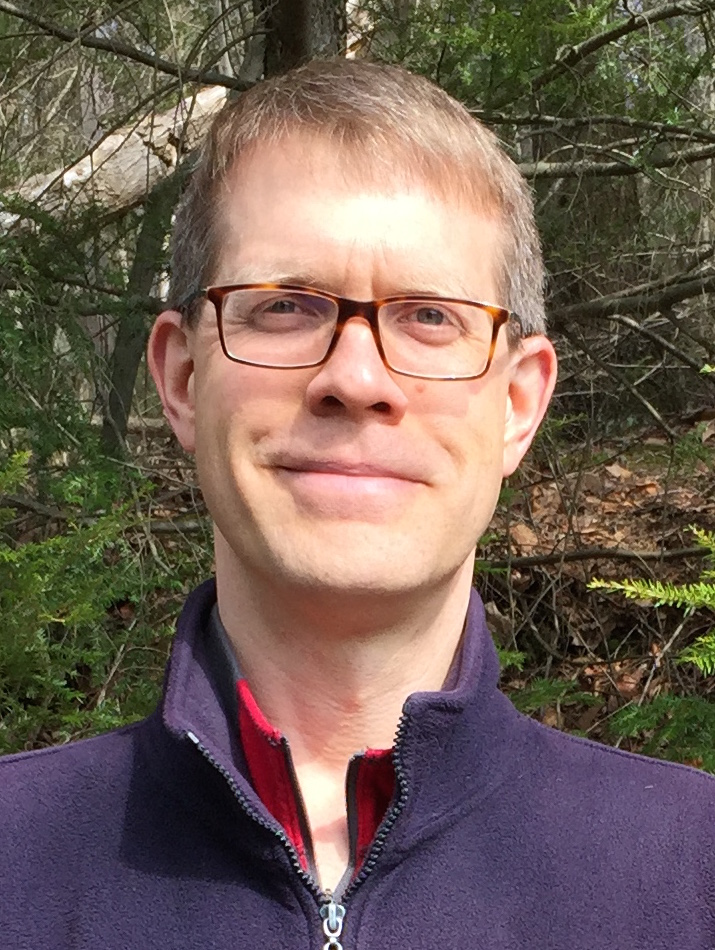
Niel Brandt

- Ted Hope (1980) – independent film producer, including The Ice Storm and Happiness
- Heather Cox Richardson (1980) – historian
- Richard Stockton Rush III (1980) – founder and CEO of OceanGate
- Greg Daniels (1981) – producer, including The Simpsons; adapted U.S. version of The Office from the BBC version; winner of four Emmy Awards
- Dave Douglas (1981) – jazz trumpeter and composer
- Pamela Erens (1981) – novelist
- Paul Klebnikov (1981) – journalist; murdered in Moscow
- Sarah Lyall (1981) – reporter, The New York Times
- Dan Brown (1982) – former instructor in English at Phillips Exeter Academy; bestselling author, The Da Vinci Code
- Kim McLarin (1982) – novelist
- Stephen Metcalf (1982) – critic-at-large and columnist at Slate magazine (did not graduate)
- Nancy Jo Sales (1982) – journalist; author
- Cosy Sheridan (1982) – folk singer and songwriter
- Nicholas Perrin (1982) – former dean of Wheaton Graduate School and 16th president of Trinity International University.
- Gwynneth Coogan (1983) – Olympic athlete (10,000m, 1992)
- Adam Guettel (1983) – musical theater composer; composed The Light in the Piazza; winner of six Tony Awards
- Chang-Rae Lee (1983) – author
- Charles Cameron Ludington (1983) – historian
- Henry Blodget (1984) – editor and CEO of Business Insider
- Julie Livingston (1984) – public health historian, anthropologist, MacArthur Fellow
- David Chipman (1984) – ATF agent and gun control activist
- Stephanie Stebich (1984) – director of the Smithsonian American Art Museum
- Roland Tec (1984) – writer, director
- Vanessa Friedman (1985) – fashion critic
- Shinichi Mochizuki (1985) – mathematician
- Edmund Perry (1985) – teenager shot and killed by NYPD officers; inspiration to Michael Jackson
- Maya Forbes (1986) – screenwriter and television producer
- David Folkenflik (1987) – National Public Radio reporter
- Christine Harper (1987) – chief financial correspondent at Bloomberg News
- Tal Keinan (c. 1987) – Israeli entrepreneur, financier
- Kenji Yoshino (1987) – law school professor, author
- Peter Orszag (1987) – director of U.S. Office of Management & Budget under President Barack Obama
- China Forbes (1988) – musician (lead singer of Pink Martini)
- Claudine Gay (1988) – professor of Government and of African and African-American Studies, president and dean of Faculty of Arts and Sciences at Harvard University
- Niel Brandt (1988) – professor of astronomy and astrophysics at Pennsylvania State University
- David Goel (1989) – hedge fund manager
- Jeff Locker (c. 1989) – actor
- Joon Kim (1989) – acting U.S. attorney for the Southern District of New York
- Marvin S. Putnam (c. 1980s) – lawyer

=== 1990s ===
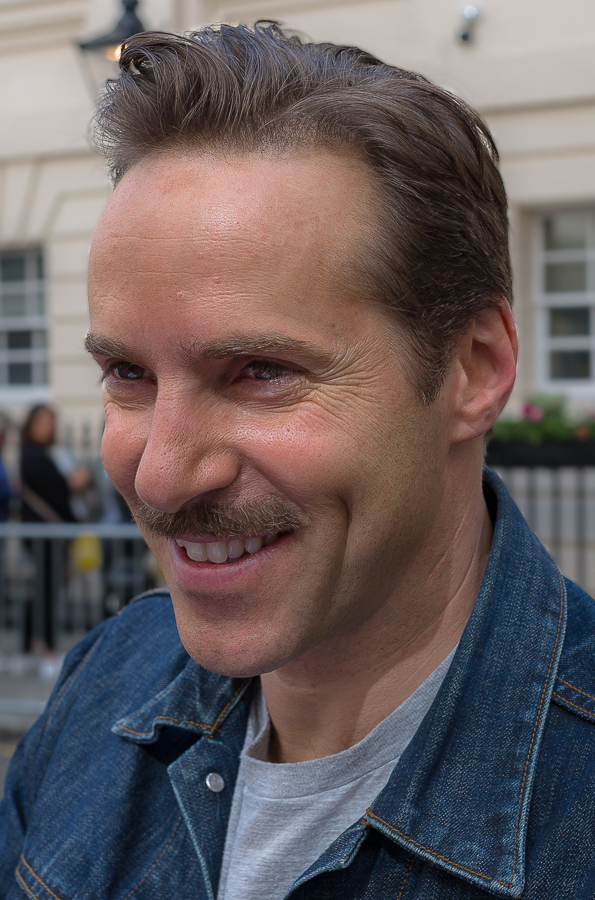
Alessandro Nivola

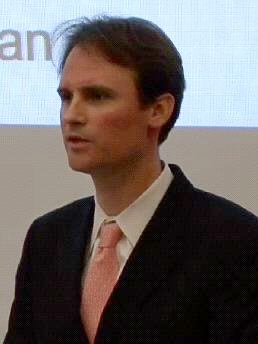
John Palfrey

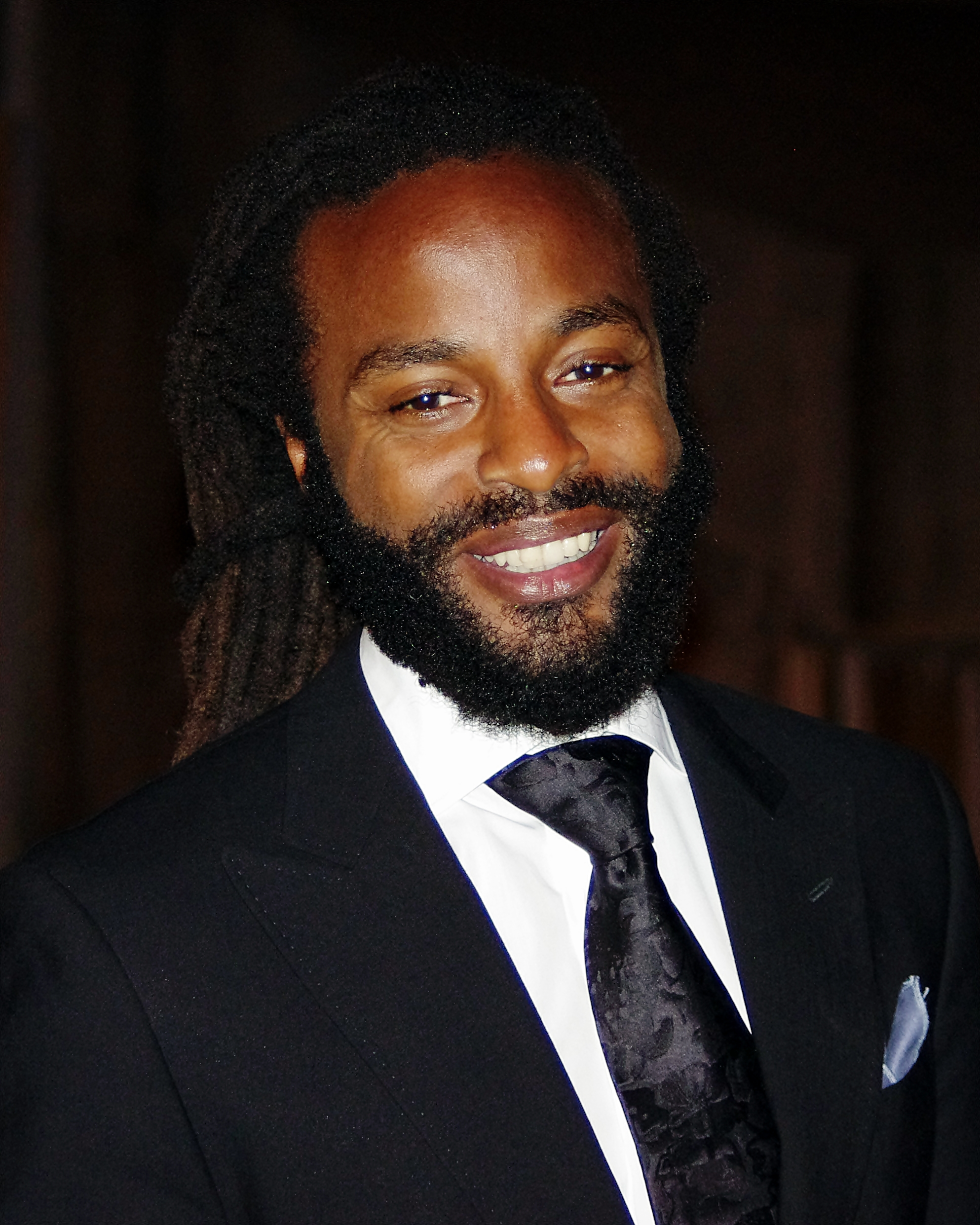
John Forté

- Jon Bonné (1990) – journalist
- Michael Crowley (1990) – journalist
- Adrian Dearnell (1990) – Franco-American financial journalist; CEO and founder of EuroBusiness Media
- Katherine Reynolds Lewis (1990) – author
- Jeff Ma (1990) – part of MIT blackjack team, basis of the film 21 and the book Bringing Down the House by Ben Mezrich
- Alessandro Nivola (1990) – actor
- John Palfrey (1990) – educator, scholar, law professor, former head of Phillips Academy Andover
- Brian Shactman (1990) – television news anchor
- Jeff Wilner (1990) – tight end for the Green Bay Packers
- Jonathan Orszag (1991) – economist
- Trish Regan (1991) – television news anchor
- Eunice Yoon (1991) – television new anchor
- Roxane Gay (1992) – author
- Jason Hall (1992) – screenwriter (American Sniper); director
- Quentin Palfrey (1992) – lawyer, lieutenant governor of Massachusetts candidate, 2018
- Jedediah Purdy (1992) – author, law school professor
- Rajanya Shah (1992) – Olympic rower (2000)
- Brandon Williams (1992) – basketball player
- Andrew Yang (1992) – entrepreneur, presidential candidate, 2020
- Gregory W. Brown (1993) – composer
- John Forté (1993) – musician, recording artist, composer, music producer, educator, activist
- Aomawa Shields (1993) – astronomer, TED Fellow
- Debby Herbenick (1994) – human sexuality expert
- Drew Magary (1994) – journalist, humor columnist, and novelist
- Alex Okosi (1994) – media executive
- Philip Andelman (1995) – music video director
- Sloan DuRoss (1995) – Olympic rower (2004)
- Sarah Milkovich (1996) – planetary geologist, engineer
- Ketch Secor (1996) – musician and vocalist, Old Crow Medicine Show
- Hrishikesh Hirway (1996) – musician and vocalist; creator and host of Song Exploder
- Tom Cochran (1996) – Obama administration official
- Luke Bronin (1997) – mayor of Hartford
- Zach Iscol (1997) – US Marine Corps veteran, entrepreneur, 2021 comptroller candidate for New York City
- Susie Suh (1997) – musician
- Win Butler (1998) – musician; lead singer of Arcade Fire
- Joy Fahrenkrog (1998) – member of the United States archery team
- Georgia Gould (1998) – Olympic mountain biker (2008, 2012–bronze medal)
- Sabrina Kolker (1998) – Olympic rower (2004, 2008)
- Mike Morrison (1998) – professional ice hockey player
- Kirstin Valdez Quade (1998) – writer
- Soce, the elemental wizard (c. 1998) – rapper and producer
- Paul Yoon (1998) – novelist
- Mike Blomquist (1999) – U.S. National Team (rowing); 2005 Men's 8+l gold medal at 2005 World Championships

=== 2000s ===
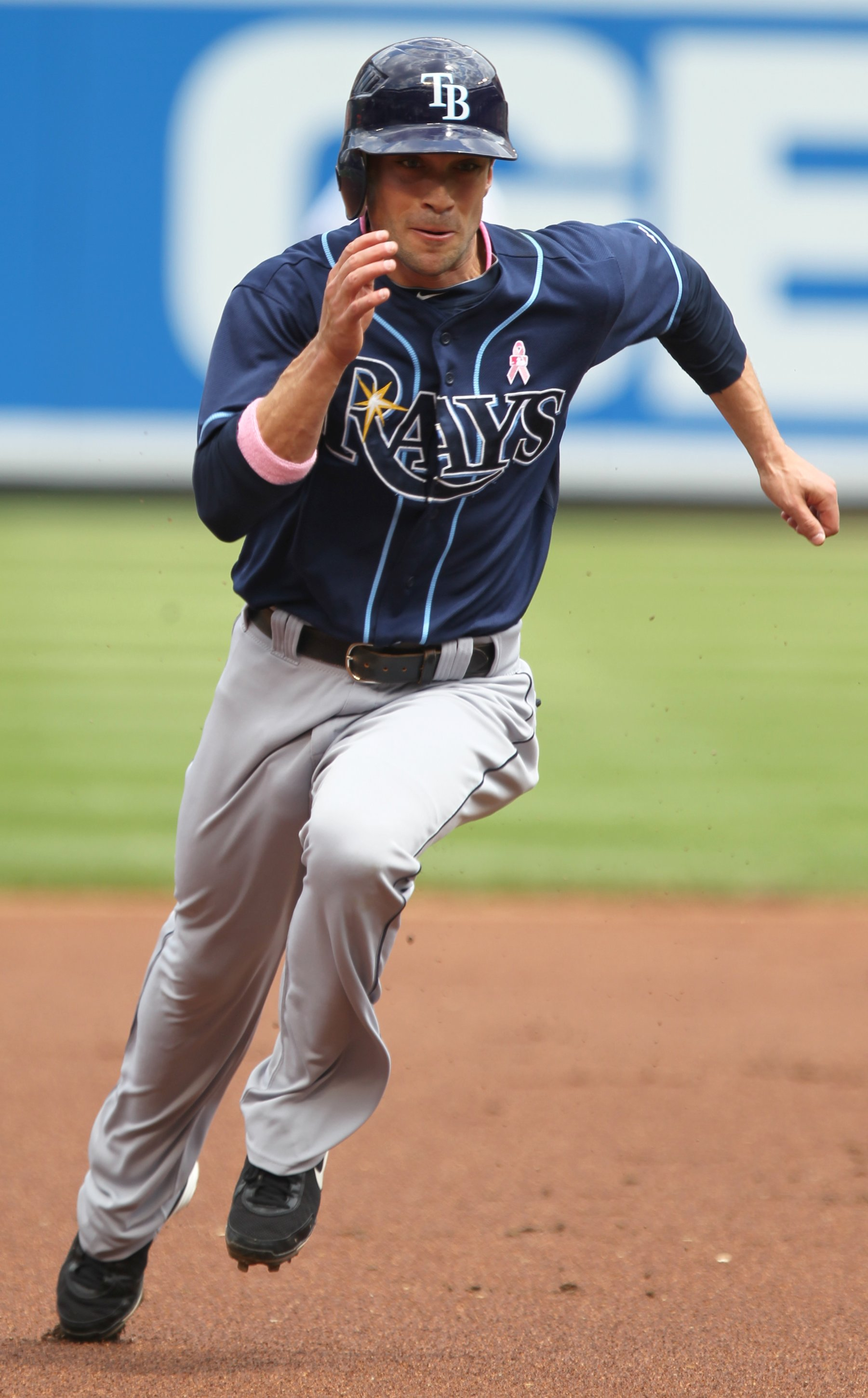
Sam Fuld

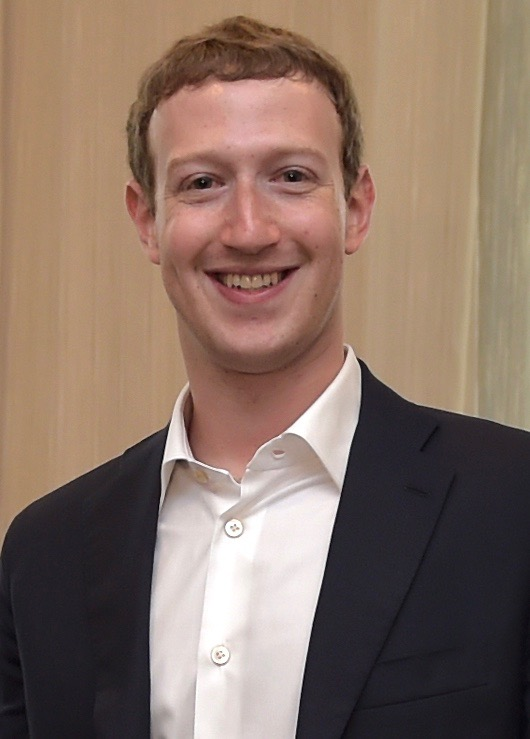
Mark Zuckerberg

- Sam Fuld (2000) – Major League Baseball outfielder for the Chicago Cubs, Tampa Bay Rays, Minnesota Twins, and Oakland Athletics; general manager of the Philadelphia Phillies
- William Butler (2001) – musician; multi-instrumentalist of Arcade Fire
- Tom Cavanagh (2001) – National Hockey League player
- Adam D'Angelo (2002) – founder of Quora, first chief technology officer of Facebook
- Heather Jackson (2002) – triathlete and track cyclist
- Andréanne Morin (2002) – Canadian Olympic rower (2004, 2008, 2012–bronze medal)
- Mark Zuckerberg (2002) – founder of Facebook
- Shani Boianjiu (2005) – author of The People of Forever Are Not Afraid
- Nicholas la Cava (2005) – Olympic rower (2012)
- Josh Owens (2007) – professional basketball player for Hapoel Tel Aviv of the Israeli Basketball Premier League
- Erik Per Sullivan (2009) – actor; "Dewey" on Malcolm in the Middle

=== 2010s ===
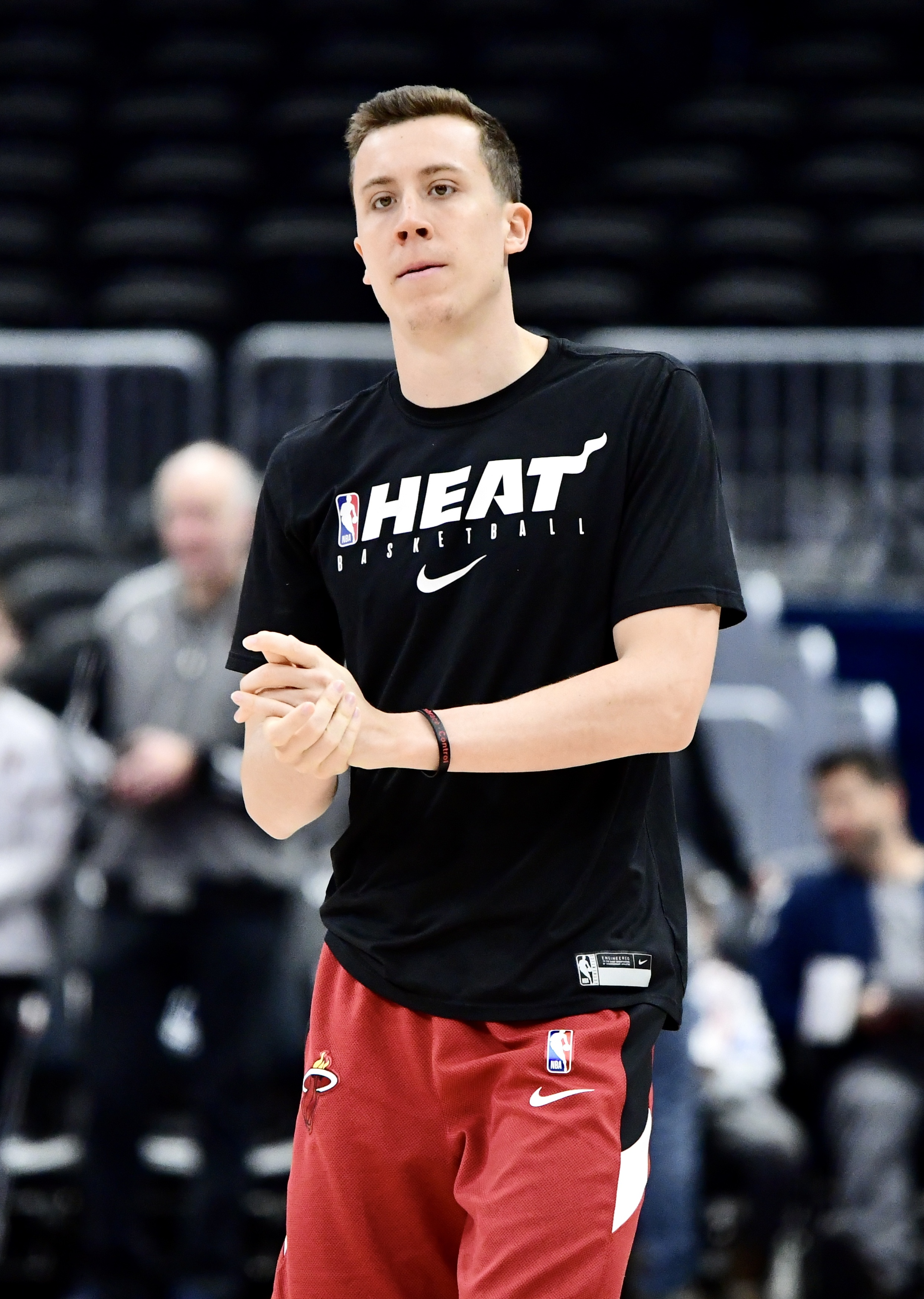
Duncan Robinson

- Caroline Calloway (2010) – media personality
- Duncan Robinson (2013) – NBA player for the Detroit Pistons and former player for the Michigan Wolverines men's basketball team
- Nicole Heavirland (2014) – USA rugby player
- Zhuo Qun Song (2015) – the most highly decorated International Mathematical Olympiad contestant, with five gold medals and one bronze medal
- Jacob Grandison (2017) – college basketball player for Holy Cross, Illinois and Duke
- Rudi Ying (2017) – Supreme Hockey League hockey player
