= Lamont (name) =

Lamont (/ˈlæmʌnt/, sometimes), also spelt LaMont, is a surname with several origins, one Scottish, with a branch in Ulster, the other French.

In some cases the surname originates in Scotland as Clan Lamont. The name is derived from the medieval personal name Lagman which is from the Old Norse Logmaðr. The Old Norse name Logmaðr is composed to two elements: log which is plural of lag meaning "law" (from leggja meaning "to lay down") + maðr meaning "man."

In other cases the surname originates in France. In this case Lamont or LaMont is a habitational name derived from several places called Amont (meaning upstream or uphill) in Haute-Saône and Haute-Vienne.

== People with the last name Lamont or LaMont ==
- Ann Lamont, American venture capitalist
- Billy Lamont (1936–2021), Scottish football player and manager
- Bishop Lamont (born 1978), American rapper
- Byron Lamont (born 1945), Australian botanist
- Charles Lamont (1895–1993), American filmmaker
- Chris LaMont, filmmaker and co-founder of the Phoenix Film Festival
- Christine Lamont (born 1959), involved in the 1989 kidnapping of Brazilian businessman, Abilio Diniz
- Corliss Lamont (1902–1995), American socialist philosopher
- Daniel S. Lamont (1851–1905), United States Secretary of War during Grover Cleveland's second term
- Dean LaMont, television director and camera operator
- Donal Lamont (1911–2003), Irish-Rhodesian Catholic bishop and missionary
- Duncan Lamont (1918–1978), British actor
- Duncan Lamont, British jazz saxophone player and composer
- Elish Lamont (1800–1870), Irish miniaturist
- Gene Lamont (born 1946), American baseball player and manager
- George Lamont, footballer from New Zealand
- George D. Lamont (1819–1876), New York lawyer and politician
- Sir James Lamont, 1st Baronet (1828–1913), Scottish explorer and Member of Parliament
- James Lamont (footballer) (1875-unknown), British footballer
- James Lamont (writer) (born 1982), British screenwriter and producer
- Joe Lamont, rock singer-songwriter and musician
- Johann Lamont (born 1957), Scottish politician
- Johann von Lamont (1805–1879), Scottish-German astronomer and magician
- John Lamont (disambiguation), several people
- Lansing Lamont (1930–2013), American journalist and book author
- Michèle Lamont (born 1957), Canadian sociologist
- Molly Lamont (1910–2001), British film actress
- Ned Lamont (born 1954), American businessman and politician, 89th Governor of Connecticut
- Norman Lamont (born 1942), British politician
- Peter Lamont (1929–2020), British film set decorator
- Peter Lamont (footballer), Scottish footballer
- Peter Lamont (historian), Scottish historian and magician
- Robert P. Lamont (1867–1948), United States Secretary of Commerce during the administration of Herbert Hoover
- Rory Lamont, Scottish rugby player
- Saudia LaMont, American politician
- Sean Lamont, Scottish rugby player
- Thomas W. Lamont (1870–1948), American banker
- William C. Lamont (born 1827, date of death unknown), New York lawyer and politician

=== Fictional characters ===
- Amber Lamont, in the Irish novel series The Demon Road Trilogy

== People with the given name Lamont, LaMont or La Mont ==
- Lamont Bentley (1973–2005), American actor and rapper
- Lamont Brightful (born 1979), American football player
- Lamont Bryan (born 1988), German-born Jamaica international rugby player
- Lamont Coleman (1974–1999), American rapper known professionally as Big L
- Lamont Dozier (1941–2022), American singer-songwriter and record producer
- Lamont Gaillard (born 1996), American football player
- Lamont Hawkins a.k.a. U-God, American rapper and member of New York hip-hop group the Wu-Tang Clan
- Lamont Hollinquest (born 1970), American football player
- Lamont Marcell Jacobs (born 1994), Italian track and field sprinter
- Lamont Johnson (1922–2010), American actor and film director
- Lamont Johnson (fretless bassist) (born 1955), American musician
- LaMont Johnson (1941–1999), American jazz pianist
- Lamont Jones (born 1990), American basketball player
- Lamont Jones (basketball, born 1972), American basketball player
- LaMont Jordan (born 1978), American football player and coach
- Lamont Warren "Lee" Marvin Jr. (1924-1987), American actor
- Lamont Pearson (born 1971), American boxer
- Lamont Peterson (born 1984), American boxer
- Lamont Reid (born 1982), American football player
- LaMont Smith (born 1972), American Olympic athlete
- Lamont Strothers (born 1968), American basketball player
- Lamont Thompson (born 1978), American football player
- Lamont Warren (born 1973), American football player
- La Mont West (born 1930), American anthropologist
- Lamont Young (1851–1880), Australian assistant geological surveyor for the New South Wales Mines Department
- Lamont Young (architect) (1851–1929), Italian architect and urban planner
- David Christopher Lamont Berry (born 1991), American basketball player in the Israeli Basketball Premier League
- Duncan Lamont Clinch (1787–1849), American army officer
- Harold Lamont Otey (1951–1994), American convicted murderer
- Marianne Lamont Horinko (born 1961), worked in the United States Environmental Protection Agency (EPA) during the first term of George W. Bush

=== Fictional characters ===
- Lamont Cranston, mysterious hero of the 1930s radio drama The Shadow
- Lamont Sanford, portrayed by Demond Wilson on the 1972–77 sitcom Sanford and Son

== See also ==
- Lamont (disambiguation)
- Lamonte (disambiguation), includes La Monte
