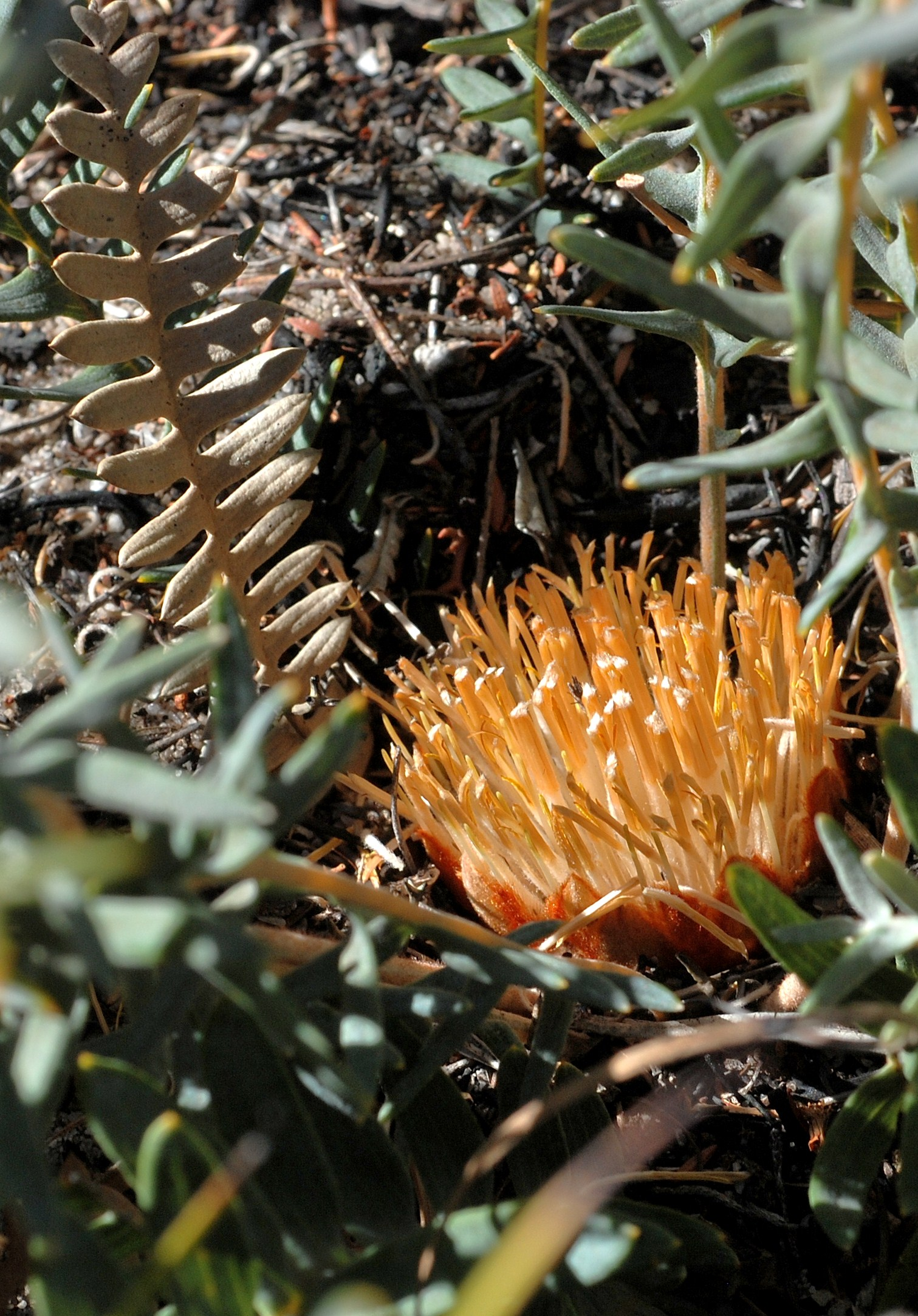
- Banksia aurantia leaves and flowers

Conservation status
- Critically Endangered (IUCN 3.1)

- Critically endangered (EPBC Act)

Scientific classification
- Kingdom: Plantae
- Clade: Embryophytes
- Clade: Tracheophytes
- Clade: Spermatophytes
- Clade: Angiosperms
- Clade: Eudicots
- Order: Proteales
- Family: Proteaceae
- Genus: Banksia
- Subgenus: Banksia subg. Banksia
- Series: Banksia ser. Dryandra
- Species: B. aurantia

Binomial name
- Banksia aurantia (A.S.George) A.R.Mast & K.R.Thiele

Synonyms
- Dryandra aurantia A.S.George

= Banksia aurantia =

Orange dryandra

Species of shrub native to Western Australia

Banksia aurantia, commonly known as the orange dryandra, is a shrub that is endemic to Western Australia. It has underground stems, deeply divided leaves with 18 to 28 lobes on each sides, about eighty pale orange-pink flowers in each inflorescence, and egg-shaped follicles.

== Description ==
Banksia aurantia is a prostrate shrub that has underground stems and reaches a height of 10–35 mm (0.39–1.38 in). The leaves are 12–25 mm (0.47–0.98 in) long and 25–45 mm (0.98–1.77 in) wide and deeply divided with 18 to 28 tapering, linear lobes on each side and prominent veins on the lower surface. The inflorescence develops on the end of the stem, with about eighty flowers with hairy, rusty red, egg-shaped to lance-shaped bracts at the base, the perianth pale orange-pink and 34–37 mm (1.3–1.5 in) long. Flowering occurs in April and the fruit is a broadly egg-shaped follicle 15–16 mm (0.59–0.63 in) long and 10–14 mm (0.39–0.55 in) wide.

== Taxonomy ==
The orange dryandra was first described as Dryandra aurantia in 1996 by Alex George, who collected the type material with Margaret Pieroni on 26 April 1994 at Little Darkin Swamp southwest of York. CALM worker Len Talbot had discovered the species in 1991. It was transferred to the genus Banksia by Austin Mast and Kevin Thiele in 2007 when Dryandra was sunk into Banksia. Its species name is from the Latin aurantia "orange".

== Distribution and habitat ==
All known populations of B. aurantia lie within Wandoo National Park, at Little Darkin Swamp southeast of York. The species grows on flat, seasonally wet, low-lying areas of grey or white sand. The habitat is open woodland, and associated species include Hakea prostrata, candlestick banksia (Banksia attenuata), holly pea (Jacksonia floribunda) and Melaleuca species.

== Conservation status ==
Banksia aurantia has been declared critically endangered under the federal Environment Protection and Biodiversity Conservation Act 1999, and rare under Western Australia's Wildlife Conservation Act 1950. There are three extant populations located within an area of approximately 4.5 km^{2} (1.7 sq mi) and covering less than 0.1 km^{2} (0.039 sq mi).
