= J. floribunda =

J. floribunda may refer to:

- Jacksonia floribunda, a leafless shrub
- Jupunba floribunda, a tree native to the Amazon Basin
- Justicia floribunda, a plant native to Brazil
