= Lomonte =

Lomonte is a surname. Notable people with the surname include:

- Ciro Lomonte, Sicilian politician
- Frank LoMonte, American lawyer and journalist
- Mauricio Lomonte (born 1982), Cuban radio announcer and television host

== See also ==
- LaMonte
- Lomont
