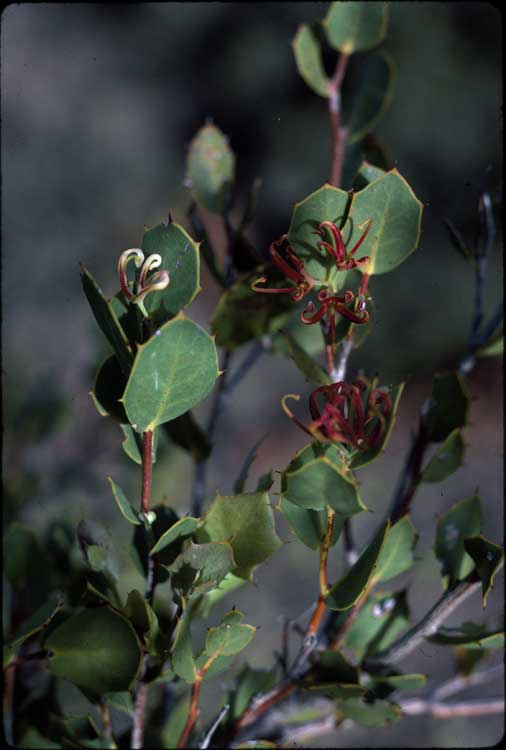
- Hakea denticulata south of Jerramungup

Scientific classification
- Kingdom: Plantae
- Clade: Tracheophytes
- Clade: Angiosperms
- Clade: Eudicots
- Order: Proteales
- Family: Proteaceae
- Genus: Hakea
- Species: H. denticulata

Binomial name
- Hakea denticulata R.Br.
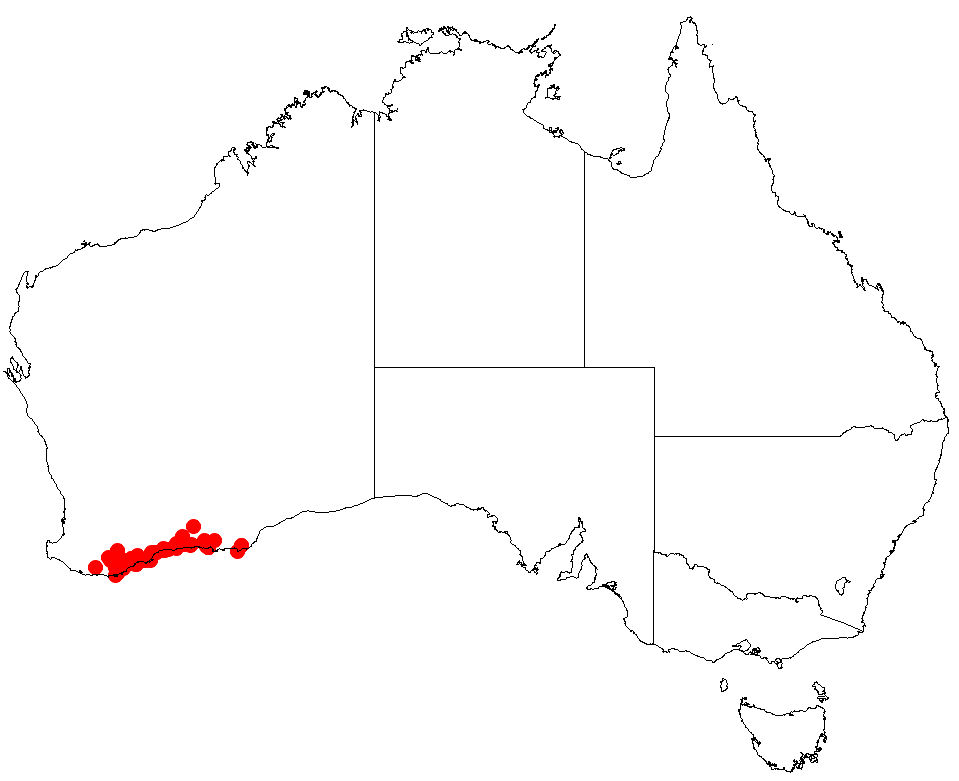
- Occurrence data from AVH

Synonyms
- Hakea rubriflora Lamont

= Hakea denticulata =

Stinking Roger

Species of shrub endemic to Western Australia

Hakea denticulata, commonly known as stinking Roger, is a species of shrub or tree endemic to southern Western Australia. It is one of the many species of Australian plant described by the botanist Robert Brown. It is a compact shrub 1–2 m (3–7 ft) high and wide with red flowers in the spring with an unpleasant odour.

== Description ==
Hakea denticulata grows as a dense woody shrub to 1–2 metres (3–7 ft) high and wide, smaller branches are hairy. The flat leaves are smooth and grow alternately along the stem, are more or less oval-shaped and 1.5–4.6 cm (0.6-0.9 in) long and 1–2.5 cm (0.4–1 in) wide. The leaf margins have 2–10 teeth measuring 1–2 mm long on each side. The inflorescence consists of 1, 3 or 5 creamy-yellow or orange-red flowers that appear in leaf axils in the upper branches on a stalk 2.5–5.5 mm (0.098–0.22 in) long with an offensive strong scent. The smooth perianth is 8.5–11.5 mm (0.33–0.45 in) long and the style 10–13 mm (0.39–0.51 in) long and smooth. The fruit grow at an angle to the stem are 23–28 mm (0.91–1.1 in) long and 7–8 mm (0.28–0.31 in) wide. The fruit have several prickles on the otherwise smooth surface. Flowers appear in July, August, September or October.

== Taxonomy and naming ==
Hakea denticulata was first formally described by Robert Brown in 1830 and published in Supplementum primum Prodromi florae Novae Hollandiae, a supplement to his 1810 work. Byron Lamont differentiated what was previously considered a form of Hakea prostrata and named it H. rubriflora in 1973, but it was found to be synonymous with H. denticulata. The specific epithet (denticulata) is derived from the Latin word denticulatus meaning "with small teeth" referring to the leaf margins. Lamont's name was derived from the Latin ruber "red" and flos "flower". Hakea denticulata was reclassified along with five other species in the Prostrata group in the 1999 Flora of Australia treatment.

== Distribution and habitat ==
Hakea denticulata occurs on Western Australia's southern coast from Albany to east of Esperance. It reaches the Stirling Range to the north. It is found on a range of soils from sand to gravel and even a heavier clay loam.

== Cultivation ==
Although the plant has attractive foliage and flowers, the latter's smell rather limits its use in cultivation.
