= James Lamont =

James Lamont may refer to:

- Sir James Lamont, 1st Baronet (1828–1913), Scottish explorer and politician
- James Lamont (footballer) (1875–?), Scottish footballer
- James Lamont (writer), British screenwriter and producer
- James Lamont & Co, a shipbuilder and ship-repairer on the Clyde
