= Peter Lamont (disambiguation) =

Peter Lamont (1929–2020) was a British film-set decorator.

Peter Lamont may also refer to:

- Peter Lamont (historian)
- Peter Lamont (footballer)
- Peter Lamont, current Chief of Clan Lamont
