= Lamont =

Lamont or LaMont may refer to:

== People ==
- Lamont (name), people with the surname or given name Lamont or LaMont
- Clan Lamont, a Scottish clan

== Places ==
=== Canada ===
- Lamont, Alberta, a town in Canada
- Lamont County, a municipal district in Alberta

=== United States ===
- Lamont, California
- Lamont, Florida
- Lamont, Iowa
- Lamont, Kansas
- Lamont, Kentucky
- Lamont, Nebraska
- Lamont, Oklahoma
- Lamont, Washington
- Lamont, Wisconsin, a town
  - Lamont (community), Wisconsin, an unincorporated community
- Lamont–Doherty Earth Observatory, New York

== Music ==
- Lamont Harp, one of only three surviving medieval Gaelic harps

== Other uses ==
- Lamont (lunar crater), a crater on the Moon
- Lamont (Martian crater), a crater on Mars
- Lamont Gallery, an art gallery in Exeter, New Hampshire
- Lamonts, a chain department store

== See also ==
- Lamonte (disambiguation)
