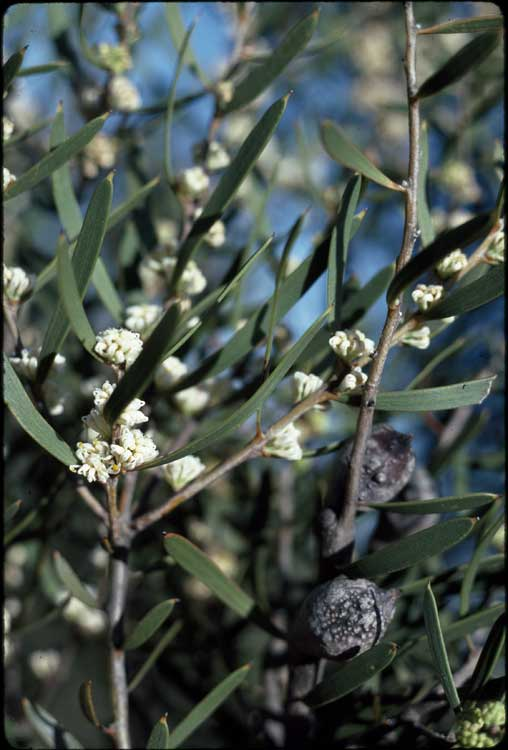
- Hakea cygnus subsp. cygnus near Eneabba

Scientific classification
- Kingdom: Plantae
- Clade: Tracheophytes
- Clade: Angiosperms
- Clade: Eudicots
- Order: Proteales
- Family: Proteaceae
- Genus: Hakea
- Species: H. cygnus

Binomial name
- Hakea cygnus Lamont
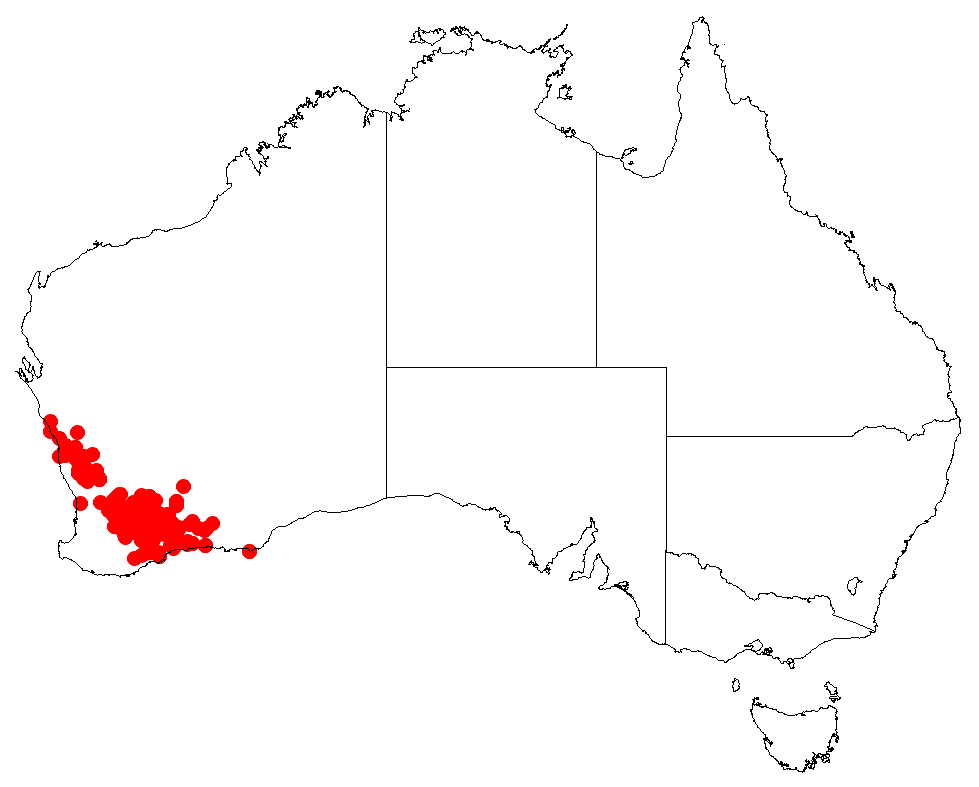
- Occurrence data from Australasian Virtual Herbarium

= Hakea cygnus =

Species of shrub endemic to Western Australia

Hakea cygnus, commonly known as the swan hakea, is a species of flowering plant in the family Proteaceae. It usually grows as a dense shrub with creamy-white upright flowers appearing from July to August. It is endemic to Western Australia.

== Description ==
Hakea cygnus is an upright non-lignotuberous shrub growing to 0.4–2 m (1–7 ft) high. The smaller branches are densely covered in flattened silky hairs at flowering time. The leaves are variable, they may be flat and thick, narrowly egg-shaped widest in the middle, more or less needle-shaped or triangular in cross-section. Leaves are smooth 2–7.5 cm (0.79–3.0 in) long and 1.2–9 mm (0.047–0.35 in) wide with prominent veins on the leaf margin. The upper side of the leaves has 1–3 obscure longitudinal veins, the underside veins barely visible. The inflorescence consists of 6–14 creamy-white flowers in racemes, appearing upright and singly in leaf axils. The cream-white pedicels are smooth, rarely with soft short flattened hairs. The perianth a cream-white and the style is 5.5–7 mm (0.22–0.28 in) long. The oval to egg-shaped fruit are 2.1–3.7 cm (0.83–1.5 in) long and 1.2–2 cm (0.47–0.79 in) wide growing at an angle on a short thick stalk. The fruit is barely beaked but has a short prominent point. The seed are pale brown with darker streaks, are broadly egg-shaped to almost triangular or circular and 12–20 mm (0.47–0.79 in) long. Flowers appear either from May to June or August to September.

== Taxonomy and naming ==
This species was first formally described in 1987 by Byron Barnard Lamont who gave it the name Hakea cygna and published the description in the Botanical Journal of the Linnean Society. In 2019, Alex George noted that under Article 23.5 of the International Code of Nomenclature for algae, fungi, and plants, the specific epithet for this species should be cygnus, meaning "swan".

In the same edition of the Botanical Journal of the Linnean Society, Byron Lamont described two subspecies of Hakea cygnus, and the names are accepted by the Australian Plant Census.

- Hakea cygnus subsp. cygnus has flat, thick, linear to narrowly egg-shaped leaves 2.5–9 mm (0.098–0.35 in) wide.
- Hakea cygnus subsp. needlei has variable leaves either narrowly linear, needle-shaped or triangular in cross-section and 1.2–2 mm (0.047–0.079 in) wide. Restricted to an area south of Lake King.

== Distribution and habitat ==
Hakea cygnus is widely distributed from Geraldton to Ravensthorpe in the south-east and east to Cape Arid. It grows in heath or mallee-heath on gravelly loams, sandy loams, white yellow or grey sand, often over laterite.

- Subspecies cygnus is widespread from Eneabba in the north to the wheatbelt region of Western Australia to Merredin and south to Esperance.
- Subspecies needlei has a restricted distribution with scattered populations just south of Lake King and in the Pallarup Nature Reserve.

== Conservation status ==
Hakea cygnus subsp. needlei is classified as "Priority Two" by the Western Australian Government Department of Parks and Wildlife, meaning that it is poorly known and from only one or a few locations.
