= De la Huerta–Lamont Treaty =

1922 treaty between Mexico and the ICBM

De la Huerta-Lamont Treaty
- Signed: June 16, 1922
- Location: Offices of the Mexican Finance Commission at 120 Broadway, New York, NY
- Effective: September 29, 1922
- Expiration: June 30, 1924
- Signatories: Adolfo de la Huerta, Thomas W. Lamont, Álvaro Obregón
- Parties: Mexico; International Committee of Bankers on Mexico
- Ratifiers: Congress of Mexico

The De la Huerta–Lamont Treaty (Spanish: Acuerdos De la Huerta-Lamont) was a treaty signed in 1922 between Mexico and the International Committee of Bankers on Mexico (ICBM) on Mexico's substantial debts after the Mexican Revolution.

The treaty was negotiated by the Secretariat of Finance and Public Credit, Adolfo de la Huerta, and the chairman of the ICBM, Thomas W. Lamont. It was considered the initial step in the normalization of the foreign relations of Mexico and was the basis of the next several decades of Mexican foreign financing agreements.

== Background ==
Mexico had been in default on its bonds since late 1913.

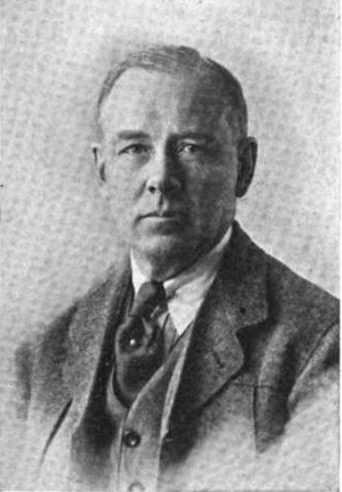
Thomas W. Lamont ca. 1922

Claiming pressure from European bankers, in 1918, Lamont solicited the approval of the State Department to organize an international committee of bankers. In February 1919, the State Department granted approval to bring together American, British, and French banks, which were concerned with investments in Mexico on the condition that control of the committee's policy remain in American hands. Initially, 50% of the seats on the committee were for American banks, with 25% each for English and French banks. Banking interests from Switzerland, Netherlands, and Belgium were later added to the committee.

On February 23, 1919, bankers and representatives of foreign bondholders created the ICBM. The ICBM included the most prominent and influential commercial and investment banks of the time. It was designed to be a powerful mediator between bondholders and the Mexican government. No major bank in the world would have been able to build a syndicate to lend to Mexico without having a selection of ICBM members. The ICBM agreement stated that Mexican debt bondholders would agree to adhere to the ICBM agreements with the Mexican government. At its peak in 1925, the ICBM represented 97% of Mexico's debt holders.

There was a significant amount of pressure from both the United States and Europe for Mexico to repay its debts and to deal with issues around Article 27 of the Political Constitution of the United Mexican States.

=== Different priorities ===
There was a tension between the repayment of debt and the Mexican government's potential control over Mexican natural resources, which could be used to pay down the debt. The State Department wanted the bankers to get their money and for assets not to be seized, but the bankers tried to keep the two issues separate.

Article 27 of the Political Constitution of the United Mexican States implied that US citizens' oil holdings in Mexico could be seized. In 1921, the Supreme Court of Justice of the Nation ruled that Article 27 was not retroactive for oil reserves if "positive acts" had been undertaken to exploit them. Therefore, only untouched lands were covered under Article 27.

The United States had initiated a ban on loans to Mexico in 1921 and had put the repudiation of Article 27 as its condition for lifting the ban. At the time, the United States had a virtual monopoly on potential lending capital. Lamont and the ICBM were only marginally concerned with Article 27 and its effect on American oil companies. The primary concern of the bankers was to protect the holders of Mexican securities.

The United States wanted all American claims against Mexico to be settled simultaneously. The ICBM, on the other hand, was willing to negotiate a separate settlement of Mexico's foreign debt.

== Negotiations ==
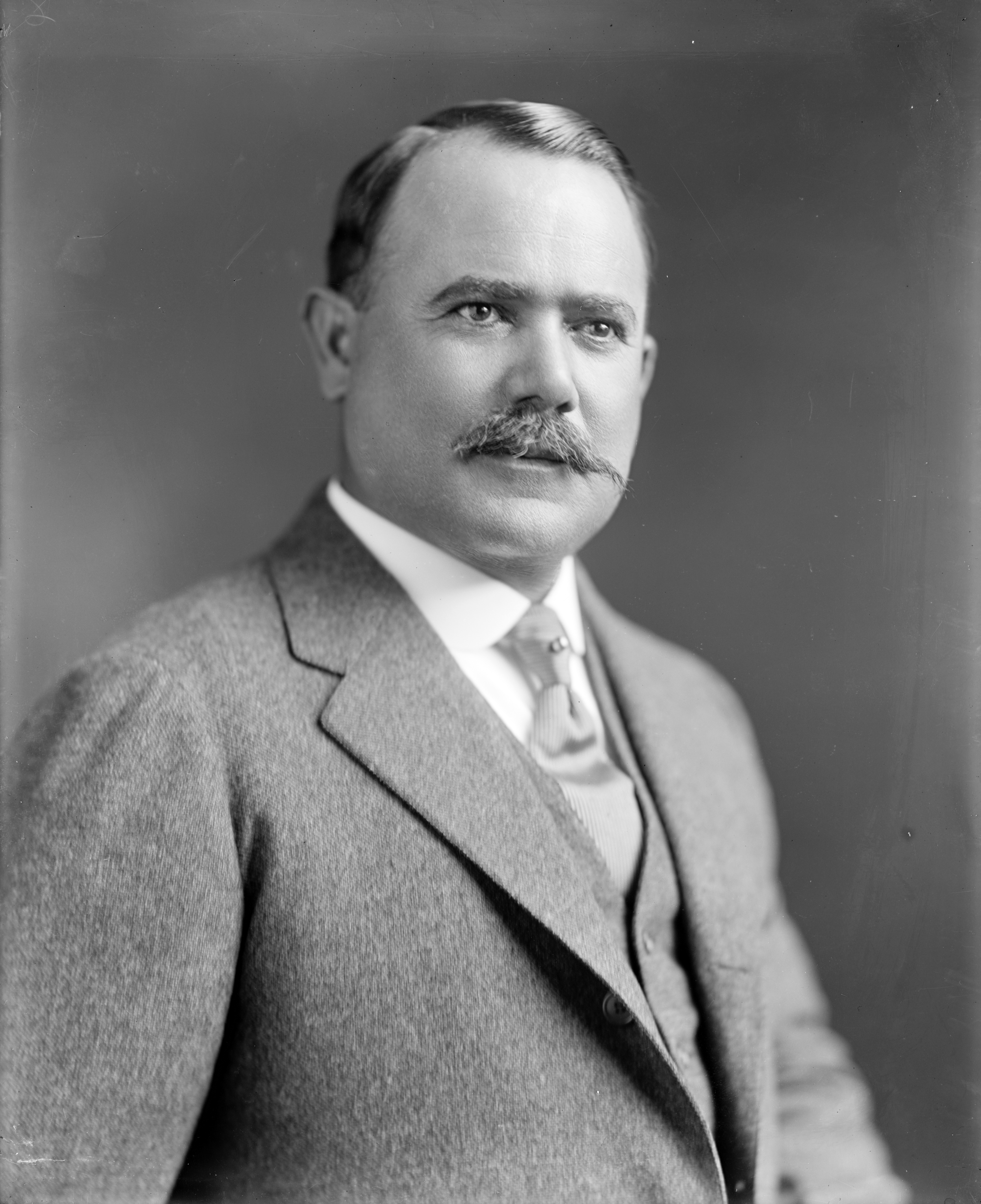
President Obregón.

The Mexican government initially invited Lamont to discuss its finances in 1921. Lamont obtained approval to begin negotiations with the administration of President Álvaro Obregón from the State Department in June 1921. Lamont sent a letter with a quasi-ultimatum, stating that negotiations could not begin until Mexico had declared that Article 27 was not retroactive. The Mexican government ignored that but was not pressed by Lamont.

Lamont negotiated in Mexico from October 5 to October 21, 1921. The initial negotiations were unsuccessful. Lamont did not accept a plan that required a depreciation of the debt. De la Huerta felt that Lamont's terms were too onerous and humiliating.

There were a number of issues in the negotiations. The Mexican government insisted for any debt settlement to include a new loan, and Obregón argued that without new funds, Mexico would probably be unable to live up to any agreement.

The ICBM said that no new loan would be granted without a debt agreement and official American recognition of Mexico.

Negotiations resumed in January 1922 in New York City with Eduardo Iturbide, managing director of the Bank of Commerce and Industry of Mexico City, representing de la Huerta and the Mexican government. They failed to come to an agreement, and Iturbide was recalled on January 18, 1922.

On March 3, 1922, the US State Department sent a message to the banking community, which effectively stopped any loans originating from the United States from non-members of the ICBM.

In late May, de la Huerta was sent to the United States.

=== Agreement reached ===
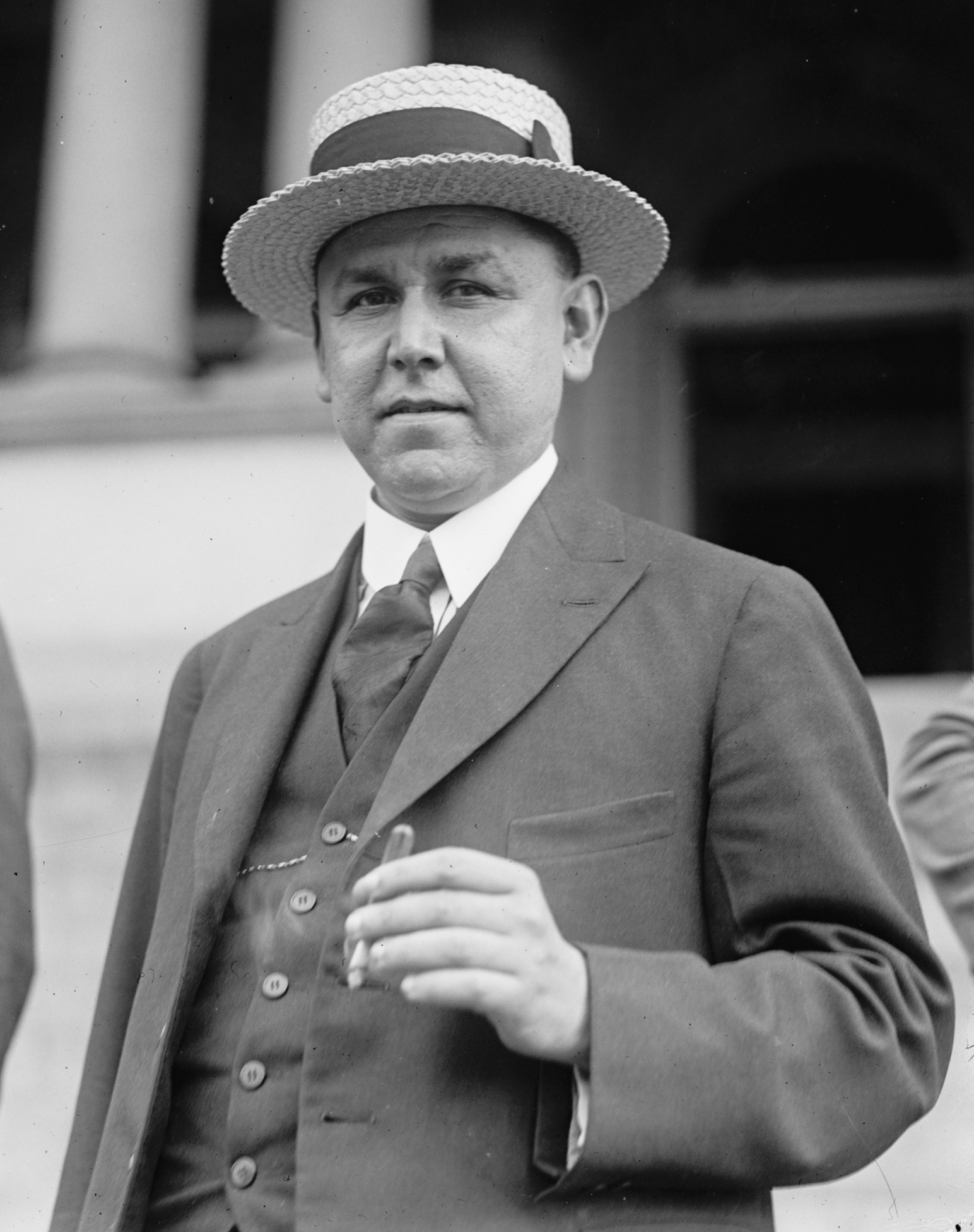
Adolfo de la Huerta, July 18, 1922

A new round of talks began on June 2, and de la Huerta and Lamont signed the self-titled De la Huerta–Lamont Treaty at 6pm on June 16 at the offices of the Mexican Finance Commission at 120 Broadway, New York City. The signatures were attested by I. H. Pachin, the secretary of the ICBM.

The tentative accord awaited ratification from Obregón. Initially, Obregón refused to ratify the agreement and stated that he was skeptical of the "good faith and sincerity" of the committee. Instead, he told de la Huerta to immediately open negotiations for a new loan.

Lamont reminded de la Huerta that no loan was possible until the United States recognized the Obregón government. Realizing that recognition from the United States would not be forthcoming without a debt agreement, Obregón reluctantly signed the treaty on August 7, 1922. It was a surprise that he signed the treaty before he went on vacation because he had said that he would study it while on vacation. De la Huerta convinced him to quickly sign the treaty.

The Congress of Mexico ratified the treaty in September, and the agreement became effective on September 29, 1922.

== Terms ==
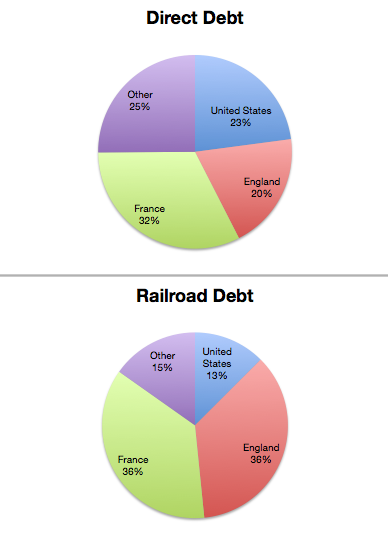
Mexican debt in 1922

The ICBM got nearly everything that it wanted in the treaty. Payments on the current interest on Mexican bonds was to start January 2, 1923, and back interest was going to be paid by January 1, 1928.

The treaty dealt with all the external Mexican government debts, direct or guaranteed, the railroad debt, and some internal government debts largely held outside Mexico. The treaty consolidated Mexico's debts.

The preamble of the treaty stated that the ICBM recognized the "difficulties with which Mexico has had to contend and the limitations upon her capacity for the immediate payment." The country desired to co-operate "with the Mexican government in the solution of its problems and in the upbuilding of its credit." In addition, the ICBM recommended “bondholders make substantial adjustments of their rights."

Mexico agreed to set aside funds that would allow it to begin making full payments on its bonds in 1928. Mexico said it would commit $15 million to the fund in 1923 and to increase the amount that it was putting in the fund by $2.5 million each year.

The money was to come from 10% of the gross revenue of Mexican railroads and an oil export tax. If that was too little, the difference was to be made up of bonds, which would not bear interest until 1928 and then would bear 3% after 1928, with a maturity date of 1943. Mexico agreed to make forty equal payments from 1928, which would pay off all the bonds by 1968. Also, Mexico agreed to privatize its railroads, but the government would still be in charge of the railroads' debt.

The total debt covered by the agreement pre-interest was $507,457,000. The interest owed was around $280,000,000.

The amount of direct debt held was 22.9% United States, 19.6% United Kingdom, and 32.4% France. The railroad debt was also mostly in foreign hands: 12.5% United States, 35.9% United Kingdom, and 36.4% France.

There was no timeline set for privatizing the Mexican railroads.

== Aftermath ==
The treaty had mixed effects. It was considered a brilliant success by some. The treaty represented a short-term solution to others because of the heavy burden it imposed on government finances. De la Huerta's supporters tried to claim the treaty was a victory for Mexico.

The treaty paved the way for the Bucareli Treaty between Mexico and the United States in 1923, which led to recognition of Obregón's government by the United States in August 1923.

The repayment of the debt took money away from social reform. Mexico paid about $15 million in 1922 for the first annual deposit of the debt agreement. The ICBM lent $350,000, which Mexico lacked to complete the first payment and paid back a year later. Mexico also sent the ICBM $700,000 at the beginning of 1923, as part of the second payment, due in 1924.

The treaty also led to de la Huerta's rebellion in 1923. The cost of putting down the rebellion, as well as the inability of Mexico to secure new loans, caused Mexico to go into default again. On June 30, 1924, Obregón ordered the suspension of further payment, which made it necessary for another adjustment of the foreign Mexican debt.

That was done in the Pani-Lamont Amendment to the De la Huerta–Lamont Treaty, which reduced Mexico's debt while the country kept its credit status. Mexico again defaulted on the agreement soon after the amendment was signed. Mexico made small payments on its debt from 1923 to 1927. Efforts to resolve the default continued throughout the 1930s.

The Mexican oil expropriation eventually occurred in 1938. All of the Mexican rail system was nationalized between 1929 and 1937.
