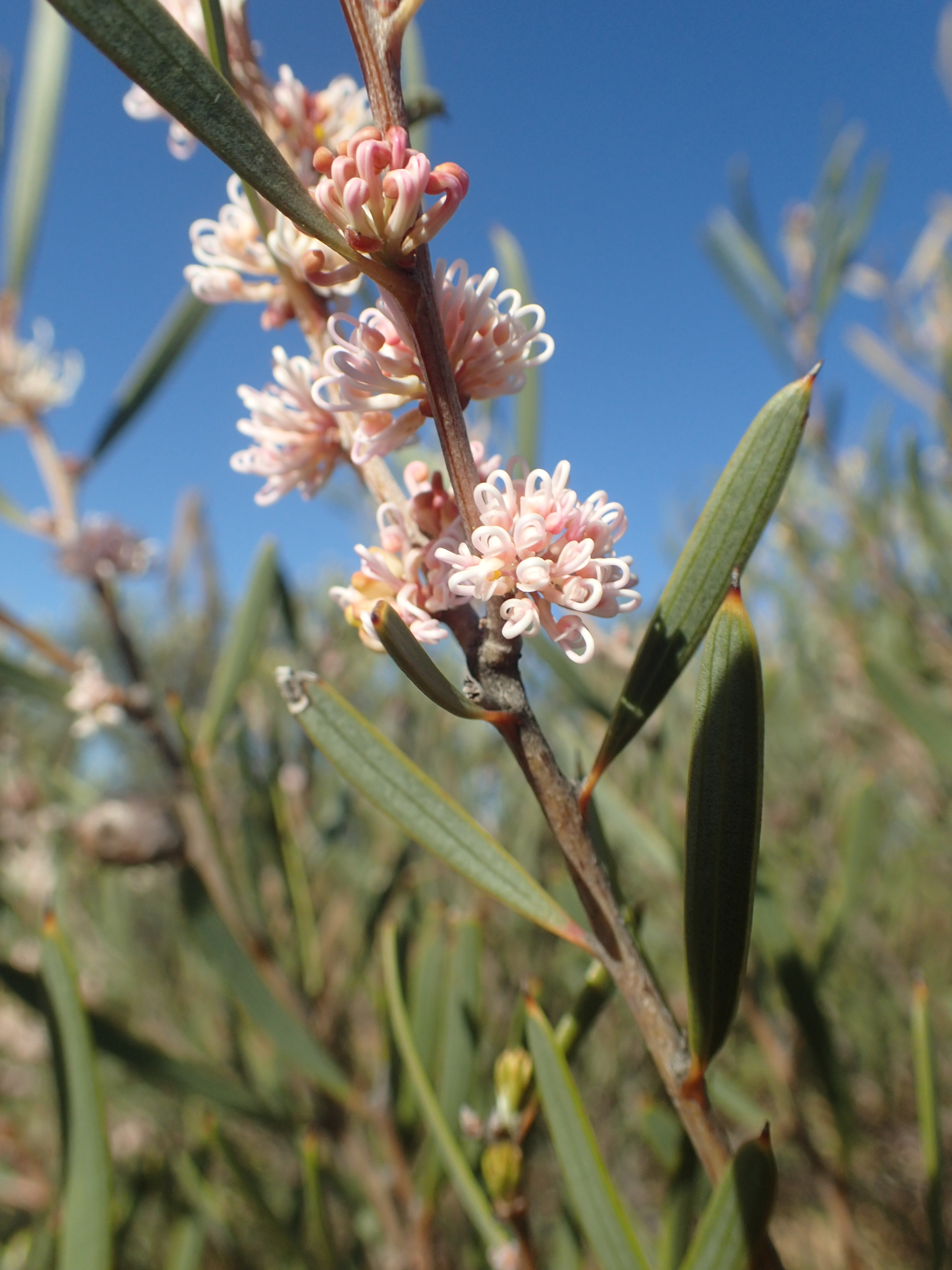
- Hakea erecta growing near Wongan Hills

Scientific classification
- Kingdom: Plantae
- Clade: Tracheophytes
- Clade: Angiosperms
- Clade: Eudicots
- Order: Proteales
- Family: Proteaceae
- Genus: Hakea
- Species: H. erecta

Binomial name
- Hakea erecta Lamont
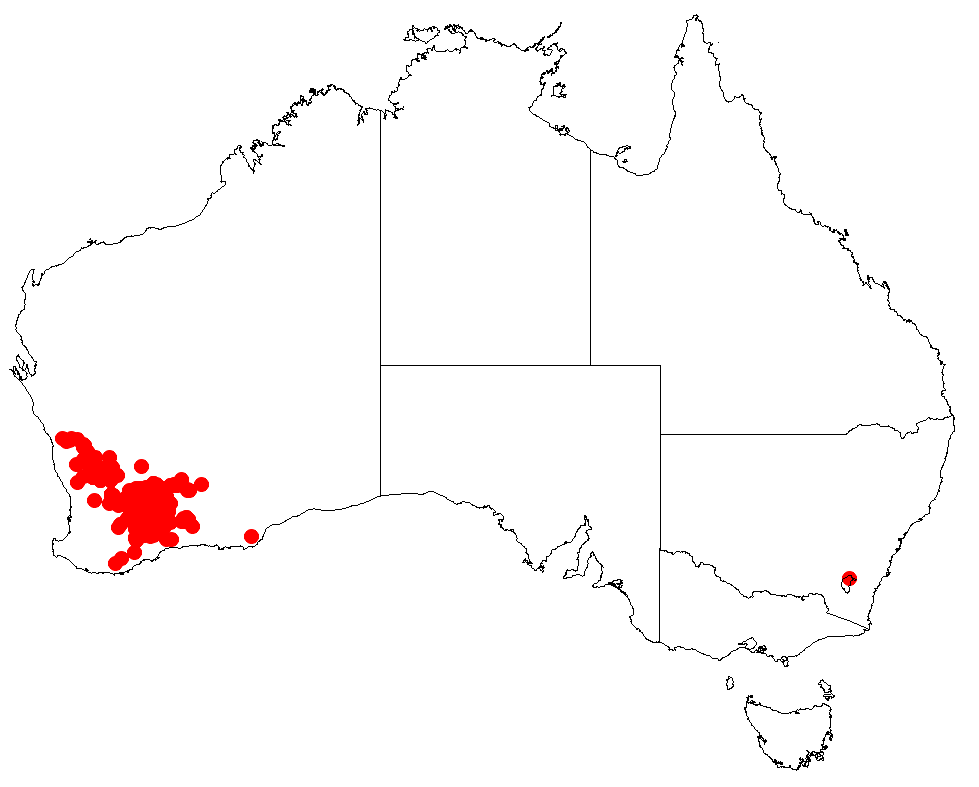
- Occurrence data from AVH

= Hakea erecta =

Species of shrub endemic to Western Australia

Hakea erecta is a shrub in the family Proteaceae and is endemic to Western Australia. It is a dense rounded shrub with linear twisted leaves and up to 24 pink or white fragrant flowers appearing in leaf axils in spring.

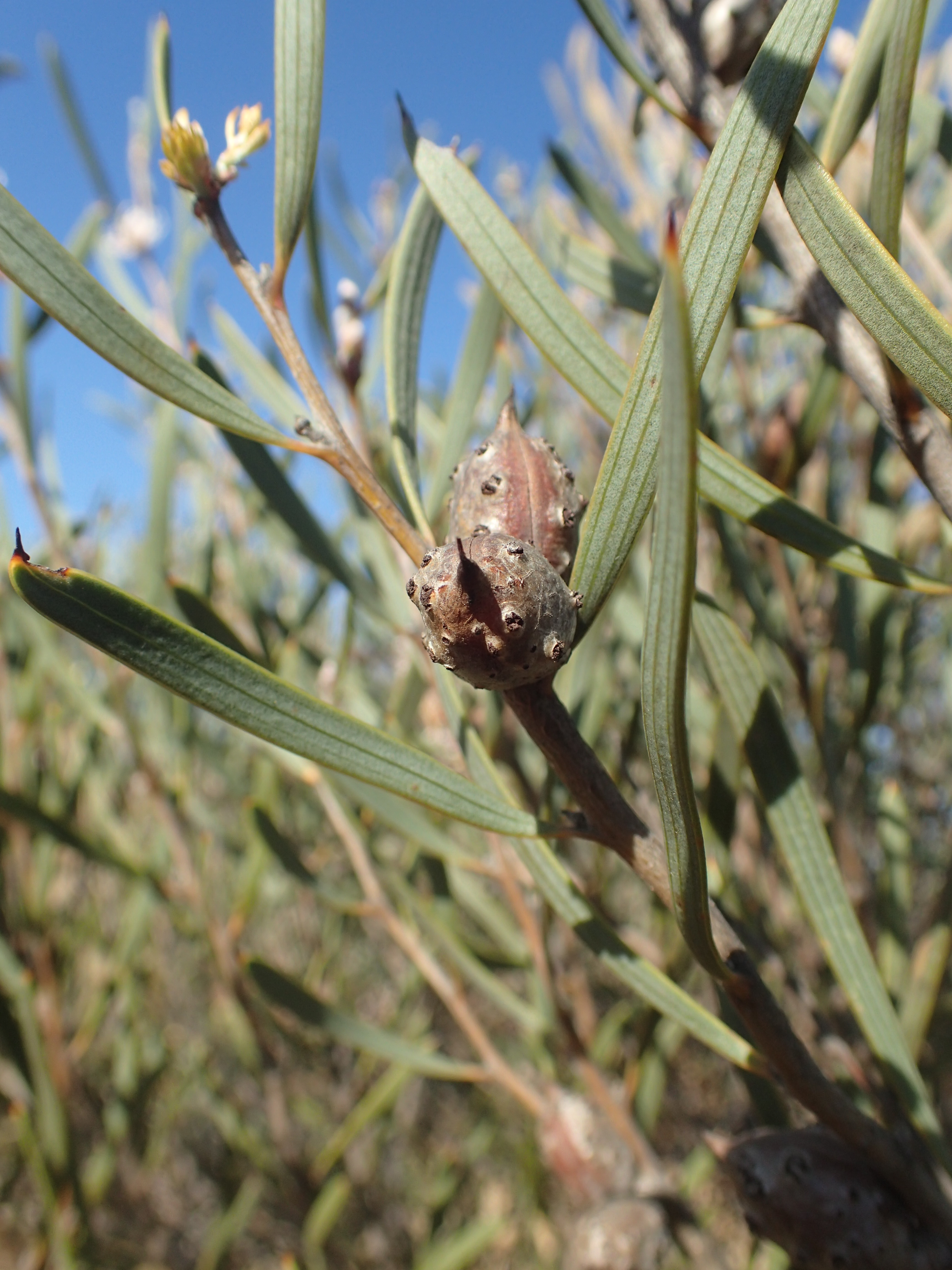
Hakea erecta fruit

== Description ==
Hakea erecta is a rounded non lignotuberous shrub which typically grows to a height of 0.5 to 2.6 metres (2 to 9 ft) and has many spreading branches and smooth grey bark. Branchlets are silky with dense flat hairs at flowering. The leaves may be either smooth or hairy, 4–10 cm (2–4 in) long and 2.5–5 mm (0.098–0.20 in) wide, linear, flat and twisted at the base and end in a sharp point. Leaves have a prominent centre vein and 3 veins on the underside. The single inflorescence has 16–24 pink-cream sweetly scented flowers in a raceme and appear in clusters in the leaf axils mostly in upper branchlets. The perianth is pink or white, pedicels are pink and smooth. The style is 6.5–8 mm (0.26–0.31 in) long. Flowering occurs from September to October. The oblong to egg-shaped fruit has a smooth surface except for a few tubercles, ending with a small pointed beak.

== Taxonomy and naming ==
This hakea was first formally described in 1987 by Byron Lamont from a specimen collected near Pingrup and the description was published in the Botanical Journal of the Linnean Society. The specific epithet (erecta) is a Latin word meaning "upright", referring to the more or less erect stems, leaves and fruit.

== Distribution and habitat ==
It is endemic to an area in the Mid West, Wheatbelt, Great Southern and Goldfields-Esperance regions of Western Australia where it grows in scrubland and low woodland on deep sandy soils often around laterite.

== Conservation status ==
Hakea erecta is classified as "not threatened" by the Western Australian Government Department of Parks and Wildlife.

== Use in horticulture ==
Hakea erecta is a frost-tolerant, long-flowering, mid-sized shrub with attractive scented blooms. It is an adaptable species, forming into dense thickets providing a good wildlife habitat and low windbreak.
