= Byron Barnard Lamont =

Western Australian botanist

Byron Barnard Lamont AM (born 2 January 1945) is a Western Australian botanist. He is currently a senior researcher within the Department of Environmental Biology of Curtin University of Technology. A specialist in ecology of the flora of the South West Botanic Province, he has published hundreds of papers.

Born in Perth, Western Australia, he attended Applecross and Mount Pleasant Primary Schools, and later Wesley College. From 1963 to 1966 he pursued undergraduate studies at the Instituate of Agriculture, University of Western Australia, graduating with a Bachelor of Agricultural Science with majors in Soils, Agronomy and Microbiology. He then undertook a Master's degree under the supervision of Brian Grieve, focussed on soil-plant relationships of Hakea, especially its proteoid roots. His research into proteoid roots earned him a PhD. in 1974. Thereafter he began studying part time for a Doctor of Science degree, which was awarded in 1993. During this period he held a series of academic positions within Curtin University of Technology.

Among his many publications are two books, around 30 book chapters and review papers, and over 100 journal papers. He is the author of Hakea cygna, H. c. subsp. needlei and H. erecta. He also published the name Hakea rubriflora, but this has since been found to be a synonym of H. denticulata.

Lamont was made a Member of the Order of Australia (AM) in the 2010 Australia Day Honours "For service to conservation and the environment, particularly Australian flora as an educator, researcher and author".

He lives in the Perth suburb of Bull Creek. He is married with two adult children.
