= Elish Lamont =

Irish artist

- Born: c. 1800/1816
- Died: 28 July 1870 (aged 54/70)

Elish Lamont or Elish La Mont(e) (c. 1800/1816 – 28 July 1870) was an Irish miniaturist.

== Life ==
Elish Lamont was born to a well-known business family in Belfast, in either 1800 or 1816. Her father was John Lamont, a stationer and printer. She went to London to train as a miniaturist, upon completing this training she returned to Belfast. She established herself as a professional artist by 1837. During her career in Belfast, Lamont lived at a number of addresses and lived alternately with her brothers, John, watchmaker and optician, and Dr Aeneas Lamont, surgeon. She opened a boarding and day school with a Miss Rock in 1851. The prospectus of which outlined that Lamont as an experienced tutor, with experience in England, France, and Germany. However, her involvement with the school had ceased by 1856. Lamont moved to an address on Clare St, Dublin in 1857, living there until 1859. Later in her life, she moved to England, where she became an acquaintance of Daniel Maclise, John Ruskin, and Charles Dickens. Lamont died on 28 July 1870, at Boley Hill, Rochester, Kent.

== Artistic work ==
At the beginning of her career, Lamont exhibited with the Belfast Association of Artists in 1837 and 1838. She was also exhibited with the Royal Hibernian Academy (RHA) from 1842 to 1858, and then again in 1870. It is possible that she is the contributing "Mrs Lamont" to the Northern Irish Art Union exhibition in Belfast in 1843 with 2 miniatures. She exhibited 7 miniatures at the Royal Academy of Arts (RA) in 1856 to 1859 as "Miss La Monte". Lamont is considered one of the earliest known professional woman artists in Belfast, going on to have a very successful career. She was commissioned by many aristocratic families in Northern Ireland, such as Lord Bangor, the Earl of Belfast, and the Dufferins. Lamont's miniatures of Lady Dufferin were exhibited by the RHA in 1851 and RA in 1866. Her miniatures of the dowager duchess of Manchester were engraved to be included in the Court Album, and 2 of her works were gifted to Queen Victoria when her visited Dublin in 1853. Lamont also produced a series of prints of crayon drawers in 1845, illustrating Moore's Irish melodies. A 1900 exhibition of deceased local artists in Belfast featured two of her paintings. A miniature of Miss O'Hara of Ballymena in the Ulster Museum is the only known work of Lamont in a public collection.

== Writings ==
Lamont was also a writer, producing a number of publications in 1843:

- The Northern Whig
- Impressions, thoughts and sketches during two years in Switzerland
- The gladiators
- The mission of the educator

Lamont collaborated with her sister on a volume of poetry, Christmas rhymes, or Three nights' revelry, in 1846, which she illustrated. She also wrote a novel published in 1855, Love versus money.
