= Thomas W. Lamont =

American banker (1870–1948)

Thomas Lamont
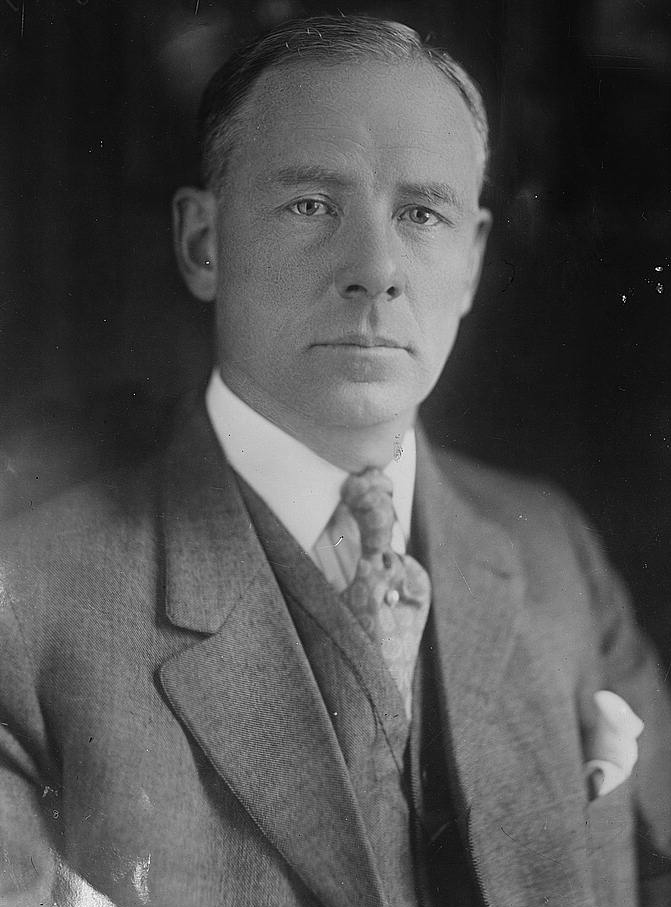
- Lamont circa 1918
- Born: Thomas William Lamont Jr. September 30, 1870; Claverack, New York, U.S.
- Died: February 2, 1948 (aged 77); Boca Grande, Florida, U.S.
- Education: Harvard University (BA)
- Spouse: Florence Haskell Corliss
- Children: 2, including Corliss

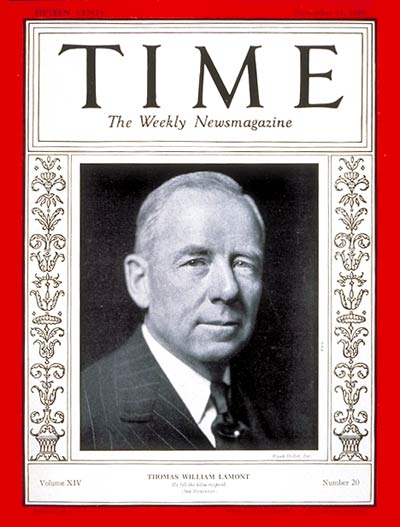
Thomas Lamont on the cover of Time Magazine on November 11, 1929

Thomas William Lamont Jr. (September 30, 1870 – February 2, 1948) was an American banker.

== Early life ==
Lamont was born in Claverack, New York. His parents were Thomas Lamont, a Methodist minister, and Caroline Deuel Jayne. Since his father was a minister, they moved around Upstate New York a lot and they were not very wealthy. He graduated from Phillips Exeter Academy in 1888, where he was editor of the school newspaper, The Exonian, as well as the school yearbook and literary magazine. He then attended Harvard College.

== Early career ==
At Harvard, he became first freshman editor of The Harvard Crimson, which helped him pay off some of his tuition. He graduated cum laude with a Bachelor of Arts degree in 1892. He met his wife, Florence Haskell Corliss, at the 1890 Harvard commencement. He started working under the city editor for the New York Tribune two days after he graduated from Harvard in 1892. He married Florence on October 31, 1895 in Englewood, New Jersey.

He also worked for the Albany Evening Journal, Boston Advertiser, Boston Herald, and New York Tribune, which paid only $25, while he was at Harvard.

At the Tribune, he received many promotions, including night editor and helping the financial editor, which gave him his first taste of the financial world. He left journalism because of the low pay and went into business.

He began working in business for Cushman Bros., which later became Lamont, Corliss, and Company, and turned it into a successful importing and marketing firm. It was an advertising agency that worked for food corporations. The company was in a bad financial status, but Lamont fixed it, and the company changed its name to Lamont, Corliss, and Company. He was partners with his brother-in-law, Corliss. His banking caught the attention of banker Henry P. Davison, who asked Thomas to join the new Bankers Trust. He started as secretary and treasurer and then moved up to being Vice President and then was promoted to director. He rose to the vice presidency of the First National Bank.

He was a member of the Jekyll Island Club on Jekyll Island, Georgia.

In 1918, he purchased the New York Evening Post, of which his brother, Hammond, had been managing editor a decade earlier, from Oswald Garrison Villard. After failing to make a profit, he sold the paper in January, 1922 to a syndicate that was headed by the paper's editor, Edwin F. Gay.

== J. P. Morgan ==
On January 1, 1911, he became a partner of J.P. Morgan & Co., following Davison to the company.

=== World War I ===
The company had also started an improvised system so that the Allies could buy supplies from them. In 1917, he joined the Liberty Loan Committee, which helped the treasury sell war bonds to Americans. He also served unofficially as an advisor to a mission to the Allies, led by Edward M. House, as requested by President Woodrow Wilson.

Lamont not only advised the other countries but also went to them. Right before he was going to go to Europe, the Bolsheviks took power in Russia. He and the head of the American Red Cross, William B. Thompson, along with the approval of the British prime minister, David Lloyd George, tried to convince America to aid the Bolsheviks so that Russia would stay in the war. However, they were unsuccessful.

=== Peace negotiations ===
Both he and Norman H. Davis were appointed as representatives of the Treasury Department to the Paris Peace Conference and had to determine what Germany had to pay in reparations. He participated in the committees that drew up the 1924 Dawes Plan and the 1929 Young Plan to reduce the amount paid by Germany.

=== Influence ===
In the interwar period, he was a spokesman for J.P. Morgan because J.P. Morgan Jr. was retiring. He handled the press and defended the firm during hearings like those of the Pecora Commission that investigated powerful Wall Street bankers.

He was one of the most important agents for the Morgan investments abroad. A member of the Council of Foreign Relations, he was an unofficial advisor to the Wilson, Herbert Hoover, and Franklin Roosevelt administrations. Hoover contacted Lamont about his proposal for a debt repayment moratorium in the 1931 financial crisis. This also has important implications for later events such as his 1932 election campaign. Lamont was elected to both the American Academy of Arts and Sciences and the American Philosophical Society in 1932.

=== Japan ===
Lamont later undertook a semiofficial mission to Japan in 1920 to protect American financial issues in Asia. However, he did not aggressively challenge Japanese efforts to build a sphere of influence in Manchuria; indeed, he supported Japan's non-militaristic politics until late into the 1930s.

Ron Chernow won the National Book Award for his book The House of Morgan in which he claimed that Lamont had authored the infamous Japanese response to deceive the world about the Mukden incident, which was used as a pretext for Japan's invasion of Manchuria. That defied the expressed position of US government and the League of Nations that Japan, not China, was the aggressor.

=== Mexico ===
Lamont was the chairman of the International Committee of Bankers on Mexico for which he successfully negotiated the De la Huerta-Lamont Treaty. He continued to chair the committee into the 1940s by a series of renegotiations of Mexico's foreign debt.

=== Italy ===
In 1926, Lamont, self-described as "something like a missionary" for Italian fascism, secured a $100 million loan for Benito Mussolini. Despite his early support, Lamont believed the Second Italo-Abyssinian War begun in 1935 was outrageous.

On September 20, 1940, the fascist police shocked Lamont by arresting Giovanni Fummi, J.P. Morgan & Co.'s leading representative in Italy. Lamont worked to secure Fummi's release. Fummi was released on October 1 and went to Switzerland.

=== Wall Street crash ===
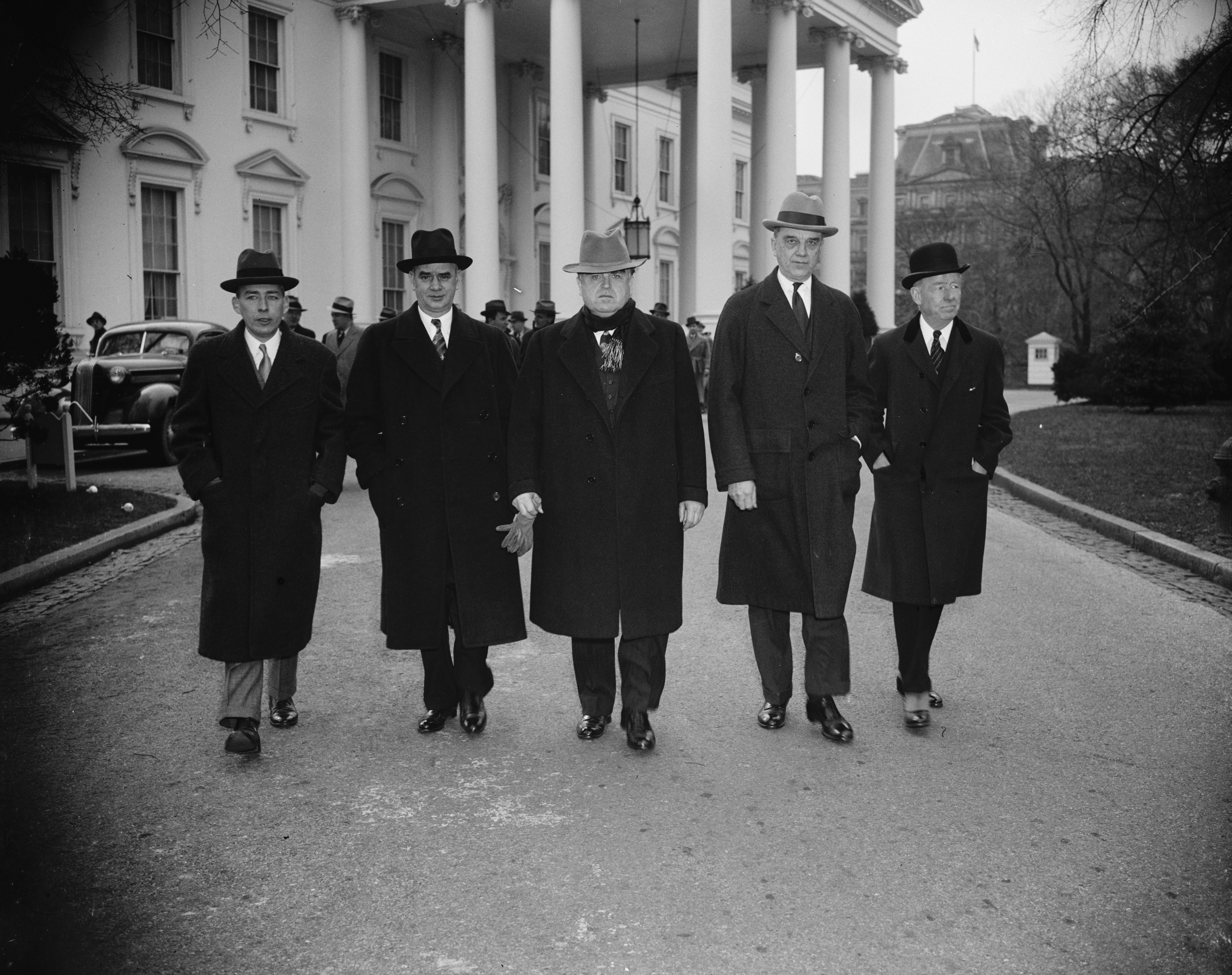
Labor and business leaders leaving the White House after a meeting with President Franklin D. Roosevelt, January 14, 1938. (L-R): Adolf A. Berle, Philip Murray, John L. Lewis, Owen D. Young, Thomas W. Lamont.

On Black Thursday in 1929, Lamont was acting head of J.P. Morgan & Co. Five days prior to the Crash, President Herbert Hoover had contacted Lamont with concerns about the rampant market manipulation by Wall Street insiders, and the systemic risk it presented to the stock market. Lamont reassured the President that there was no cause for concern, and no need for government intervention, saying "The future appears brilliant!" (Note: NY Times, 1985)

The market crashed the following Thursday. In an attempt to stop the panic, Lamont organized Wall Street firms to inject confidence back into the stock market through massive purchases of blue chip stocks. The effort failed, and stocks ultimately lost a quarter of their value that week. After the crash unfolded, the Senate Banking Committee found that J.P. Morgan (headed by Lamont), had maintained a "preferential stock list", to allow for liquidation of stocks during the crash at prices premium to actual market value. Politicians, including Calvin Coolidge, and family members of prominent bankers, were on the list. (Note: PBS)

=== As chairman ===
Following the reorganization of J.P. Morgan & Co. in 1943, Lamont was elected chairman of the board of directors, after Morgan Jr. died, becoming the first non Morgan after George Peabody to chair the bank.

== Charitable work ==
Lamont became a generous benefactor of Harvard and Exeter once he had amassed a fortune, notably by funding the building of Lamont Library. At the end of World War II, Lamont made a very substantial donation toward restoring Canterbury Cathedral in England. His widow, Florence Haskell Corliss donated Torrey Cliff, their weekend residence overlooking the Hudson River in Palisades, New York, to Columbia University. It is now the site of the Lamont–Doherty Earth Observatory.

Upon Florence's death, a bequest established the Lamont Poetry Prize.

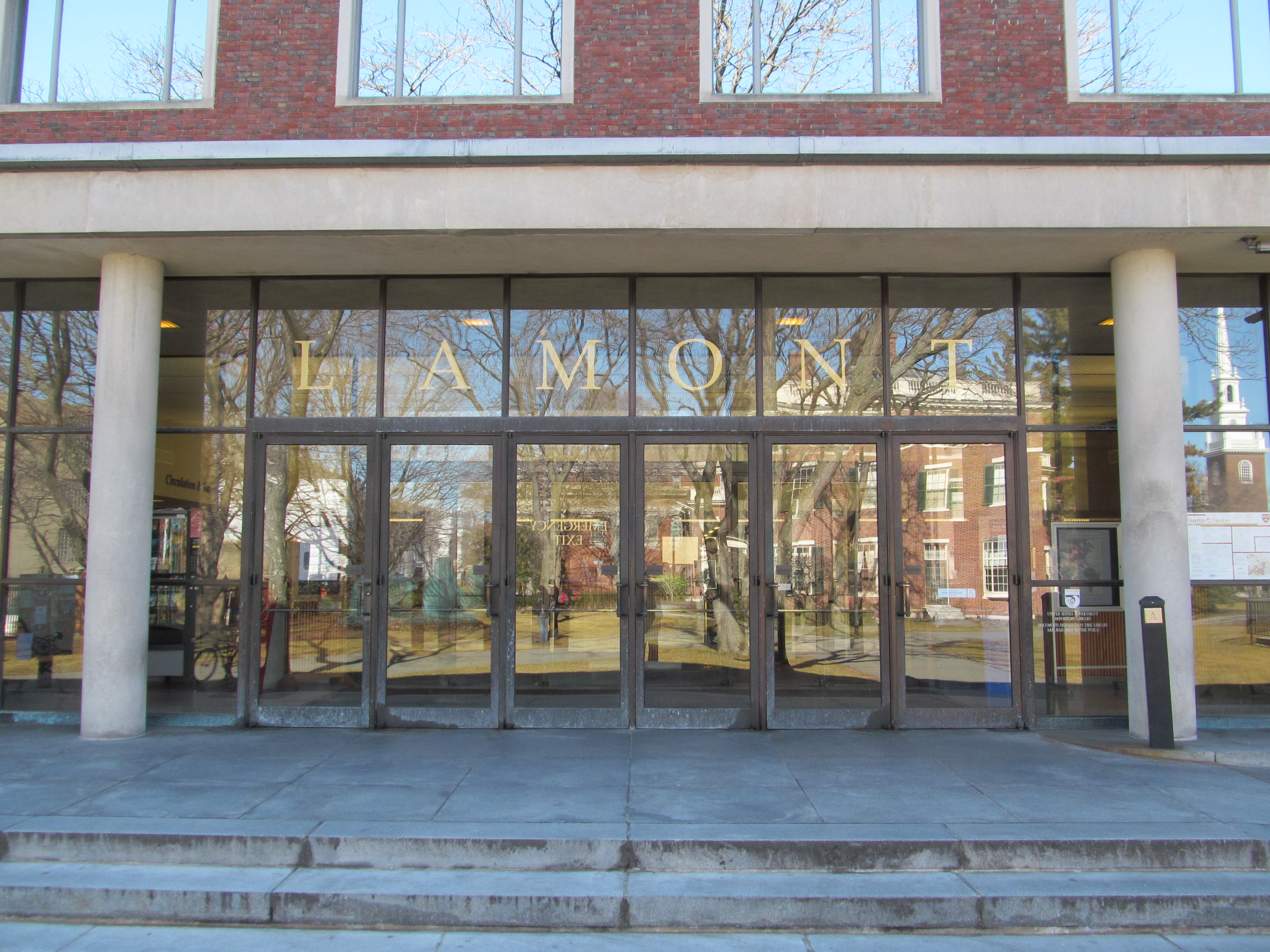
Lamont Library at Harvard University

== Death ==
Lamont died in Boca Grande, Florida, in 1948.

== Personal life ==
In 1895, Lamont married Florence Haskell Corliss. Born Englewood, NJ in 1873, Florence graduated from Smith College in 1893 and received an M.A. in Philosophy from Columbia University. Thomas and Florence had 4 children. Their son Corliss was a philosophy professor at Columbia University and an avowed socialist. Another son, Thomas Stilwell Lamont, was later vice-chairman of Morgan Guaranty Trust and a fellow of the Harvard Corporation.

One of his grandsons, Lansing Lamont, was a reporter with Time from 1961 to 1974. He published several books, including You Must Remember This: A Reporter’s Odyssey from Camelot to Glasnost about his experiences covering the important events of the time, including the assassination of Robert F. Kennedy. Another grandson, Thomas William Lamont II, served in the submarine service on the USS Snook (SS-279) and died when the submarine sank in April 1945.

One of his great-grandsons, Ned Lamont, was elected governor of Connecticut in 2018.

== In popular culture ==
Lamont is a major character in Nomi Prins' novel Black Tuesday (2011) and in Kit Holland's Soul Slip Peak (2013).

== Works ==
- Henry P. Davison; the record of a useful life Harper & Brothers, New York (NY) and London, 1933. ISBN 1176084445
- My boyhood in a parsonage, some brief sketches of American life toward the close of the last century Harper & Brothers, New York (NY) and London, 1946.
- Across world frontiers, Harcourt Brace & Co., New York (NY), 1951. ISBN 1258302160

Business positions
Preceded by J.P. Morgan Jr.	Chairman of J.P. Morgan & Co. March 13, 1943 – February 2, 1948	Succeeded by Russell C. Leffingwell
