= Lamont Young (architect) =

Italian architect

- Born: 1851; Naples, Kingdom of the Two Sicilies
- Died: 1929 (aged 77–78); Italy
- Occupation: Architect

Lamont Young may also refer to Lamont H. Young, Australian geologist.

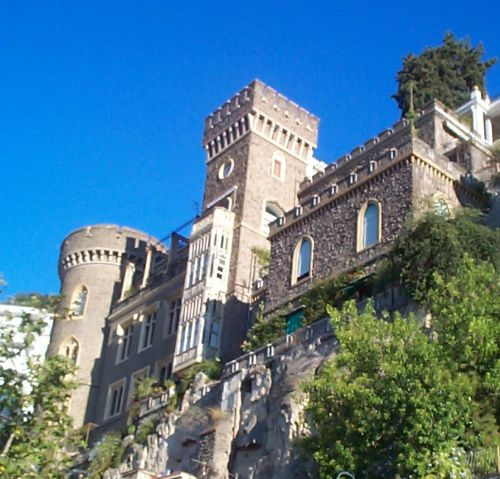
One of the "castles" of Lamont Young in Naples.

Lamont Young (1851-1929) was a British architect and urban planner from the late 19th and early 20th century — widely noted for a number of prominent buildings in Naples, Italy, his birthplace; his 1906 founding of the Automobile Club d'Napoli; and an ambitious but unrealized urban plan, The Venice District, he conceived for Naples.

== Background ==
Young was born In Naples to Giacomo Enrico Young, a Scottish landowner who'd moved to Naples from India and Elisabetta Swinhoe, born in Calcutta. Young, popularly recognized as a Neapolitan, never acquired Italian citizenship.

In addition to his architectural and planning work, Young was a noted motoring enthusiast, and his passion for cars led him to conceive Automobile Club Napoli, the Naples automobile club, officially established on February 18, 1906, at his home.

== Architecture ==
Young is noted for numerous buildings in Naples. These include his home in Grifeo Park, initially called Grifeo Castle before he sold it to the banker Carlo Aselmeyer, from whom it derives its current name. He is also noted for other buildings in Margherita Park and the Amedeo district; Villa Ebe on Monte Echia, his personal residence; and the headquarters of the Grenoble Institute on Via Crispi, now the French Consulate of Naples.

== Naples urban planning ==
In 1872, Young proposed the first of Naples' underground Naples Metropolitan lines. Though not realized, his vision is today recalled in a mosaic at the Naples Metro Toledo Station, one of the system's Stazione dell'Arte, or Art Stations.

Young subsequently presented a detailed overall plan to the Naples City Council. Called the Naples Rione Venezia or Venice District, the vision ultimately included an extensive metro network running under Posillipo, with 12 stations overall including 2 in the Vomero neighborhood as well as canals, gardens, and low-density residential buildings between Santa Lucia and the Phlegrean area; through to Fuorigrotta and terminating in Bagnoli — the latter of which Young had envisioned as an ideal European tourist and seaside resort destination. Met with resistance, Young twice updated the plan, highlighting its safety and constructability.

Although Young's plan was initially approved, it was eventually lost to a competitor plan, known as the risanamento (lit. "making healthy again"), a more drastic version of urban surgery than even Young had planned and the one that was, over a 30-year period, responsible for the rebuilding of Naples before World War I.

== Death and Villa Ebe ==
In 1929 Young, distraught over his failed vision for Naples, committed suicide by shooting himself at his home Villa Ebe. The Villa was named after his wife Ebe Cazzani who lived at Villa Ebe until 1976, her heirs ceding the property to the city of Naples. Heavily destroyed by arson in 1997, the shell of Villa Ebe remains today atop one of Naple's prominent cliffs, Pizzofalcone, overlooking the noted Castel dell'Ovo on Santa Lucia harbor.
