= John Lamont (disambiguation) =

John Lamont is a Scottish politician.

John Lamont may also refer to:

- John Lamont (sugar planter) (1782–1850), Scottish emigrant and Trinidad plantation owner
- John Lamont (astronomer) (1805–1879), Scottish-German astronomer
- John Henderson Lamont (1865–1936), Canadian judge
- John Salmon Lamont (1885–1964), Canadian politician
- John Lamont (priest) (fl. 1814), Scottish priest from Aberchalder
