= Lansing Lamont =

- Born: March 13, 1930; New York City, U.S.
- Died: September 3, 2013 (aged 83); New York City, U.S.
- Education: Milton Academy; Harvard University; Harvard Business School; Columbia University Graduate School of Journalism
- Occupations: Journalist; author
- Spouse: Ada Jung Lamont
- Children: 4
- Relatives: Thomas Stilwell Lamont (father); Thomas W. Lamont (grandfather)

Lansing ("Lans" or "Lance") Lamont (March 13, 1930, in New York City – September 3, 2013, in New York City) was a journalist and author of several books. He is known for his best-selling book Day of Trinity (1965).

== Biography ==
Born into a wealthy family of bankers, Lansing Lamont's father was Thomas Stilwell Lamont (1899–1967), a vice-chairman of J. P. Morgan & Co. Lansing's grandfather was Thomas William Lamont (1870–1948), a J. P. Morgan partner since 1911.

Lansing Lamont attended secondary school in Massachusetts at Milton Academy, where he graduated in 1948. In 1945 his brother Thomas William Lamont II (1924–1945) was a 2nd lieutenant aboard the final patrol of USS Snook (SS-279), lost at sea. Lansing Lamont graduated in 1952 from Harvard University, where he was part of the Hasty Pudding Theatricals. He briefly attended Harvard Business School but left without a degree. He served for three and a half years from 1954 to 1957 in the U.S. Army and attained the rank of 1st lieutenant. He graduated in 1958 with a master's degree from the Columbia University Graduate School of Journalism. He was from 1958 to 1959 a reporter for The Washington Star and from 1959 to 1960 the Congressional correspondent for the Worcester Evening Gazette, as well as a reporter for other New England newspapers. He then became in 1961 a staff member of Time Magazine and worked as a national correspondent stationed in Washington, D.C. He wrote about the assassinations in 1963 of John Fitzgerald Kennedy and in 1968 of Robert Francis Kennedy. From 1969 to 1971 he was the deputy chief of Time Magazine's London bureau. Subsequently he was from 1971 to 1973 the magazine's chief Canadian correspondent and from 1973 to 1974 the magazine's United Nations bureau chief and writer for the weekly World Affairs section. He was a frequent contributor to The New York Times op-ed page and appeared as a guest lecturer and panelist on television and radio shows in the U.S.A. and Canada.

In the 1980s and early 1990s, Mr. Lamont was director of Canadian affairs for the Americas Society, a group largely funded by David Rockefeller that sponsor lectures, conferences and publications about Western Hemisphere affairs. At his death, he was board chairman of the American Trust for the British Library.

Lansing Lamont served as Milton Academy trustee from 1976 to 1988. Two of his children, Douglas Lamont ’73 and Elisabeth Lamont Wolcott ’74 attended Milton as well as his grandson, Christopher Lamont ’07. Lans ... joined classmates for his 65th Reunion.

He was married to Ada Jung Lamont for 59 years. Upon his death he was survived by his widow, two sons, two daughters, and twelve grandchildren. A memorial service was held at St. James' Episcopal Church in Manhattan.

== Books ==
- Lamont, Lansing (1965). Day of Trinity. New York: Atheneum. ASIN B000PGP9C8. e-book. 1985.
- —— (1979). Campus shock: a firsthand report on college life today. New York: Dutton. ISBN 0525073094.
- —— (1994). Breakup: the coming end of Canada and the stakes for America. New York: Norton. ISBN 0393331369.
- —— (1999). No twilight about me: a life in letters. New City: Strawtown Press. ISBN 0966554213.
- —— (2008). You must remember this: a reporter's odyssey from Camelot to glasnost. New York: Beaufort Books. ISBN 978-0825305832.

as editor:

- Lamont, Corliss; Lamont, Lansing, eds. (1979). Letters of John Masefield to Florence Lamont. New York: Columbia University Press. ISBN 0-9665542-1-3.
- Lamont, Lansing; Edmonds, J. Duncan, eds. (1989). Friends so different: essays on Canada and the United States in the 1980s. Ottawa: Published for the Americas Society by University of Ottawa Press. ISBN 0776602632.
- ——; Levy, Gary, eds. (1989). Making North America competitive: economic-industrial priorities for the 1990's: a Canada-United States conference sponsored by Americas Society/Canadian Affairs, the Plaza Hotel, New York City, November 16-17, 1988. New York, NY (680 Park Ave., New York 10021: Americas Society/Canadian Affairs. catalog entry, openlibrary.org
- ——; Cohen, Dian, eds. (1990). To save a continent: business responds to North America's environmental needs: a Canada-United States conference sponsored by Americas Society/Canadian Affairs, New York City, December 6-7, 1989. New York, NY (680 Park Ave., New York 10021): Americas Society/Canadian Affairs.
- ——, ed. (1991). Reshaping the North American partnership for the 1990's: a United Europe and competitive Pacific Rim necessitate new strategic policies: a Canada-United States conference, sponsored by Americas Society/Canadian Affairs, New York City, November 14-15, 1990. New York, NY (680 Park Ave., New York 100121): Americas Society/Canadian Affairs. catalog entry, openlibrary.org
