= Corliss Lamont =

American philosopher and political activist (1902–1995)

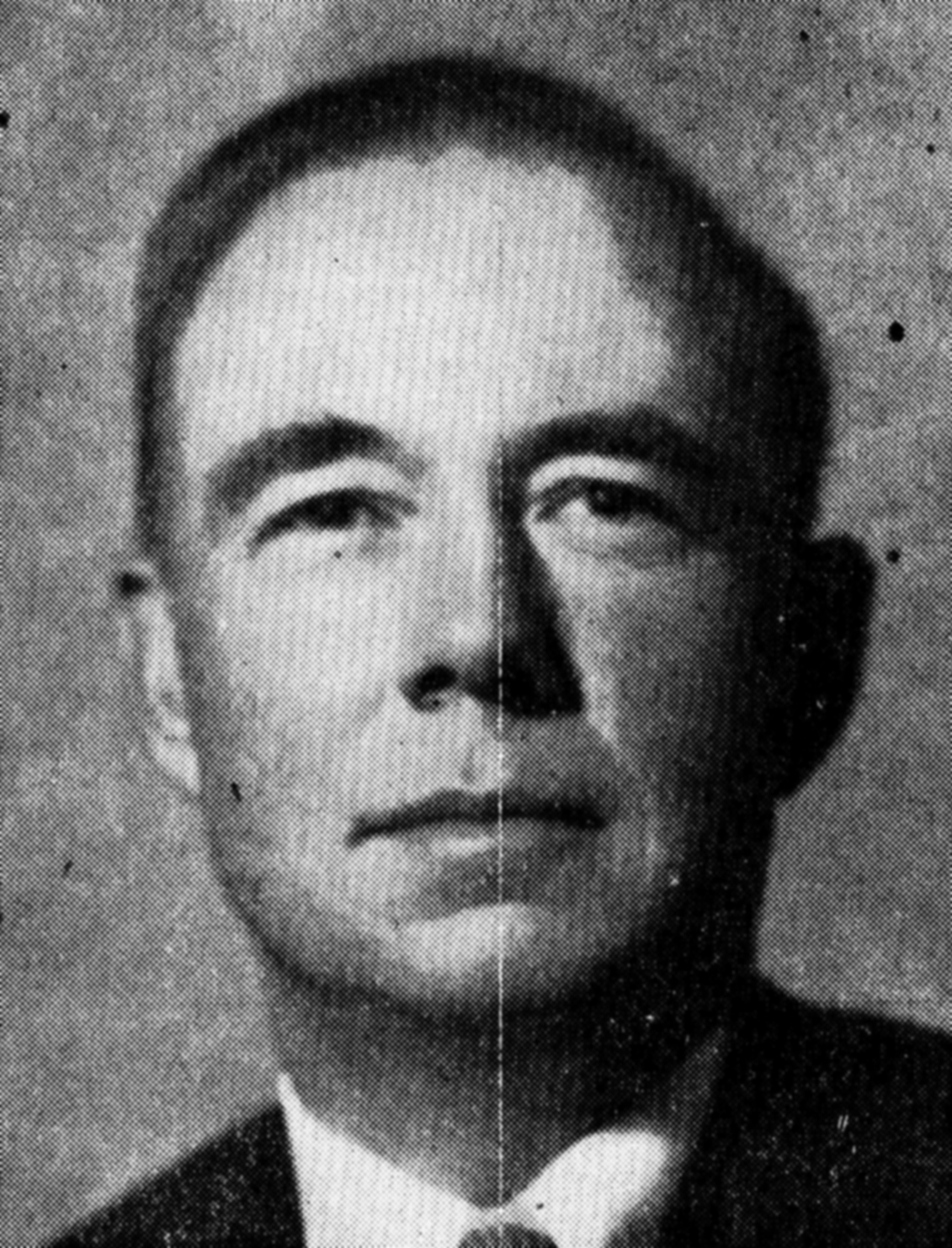
- Lamont, c. 1951
- Born: March 28, 1902; Englewood, New Jersey, U.S.
- Died: April 26, 1995 (aged 93); Ossining, New York, U.S.
- Education: Harvard University; Columbia University
- Occupations: Professor, philanthropist, political activist
- Years active: 1928–1995
- Employer: Columbia University
- Known for: Support for socialism, Popular Front, and civil liberties
- Spouse(s): Margaret Hayes Irish (m. 1928; div. 1960) Helen Boyden Lamb (m. 1962; died 1975) Beth Keehner (m. 1986)
- Children: 4
- Father: Thomas W. Lamont
- Relatives: Ned Lamont (grandnephew)

Corliss Lamont (March 28, 1902 – April 26, 1995) was an American socialist and humanist philosopher and advocate of various left-wing and civil liberties causes. As part of his political activities, he was the Chairman of the National Council of American-Soviet Friendship, starting from the early 1940s.

== Career ==
=== Early years ===
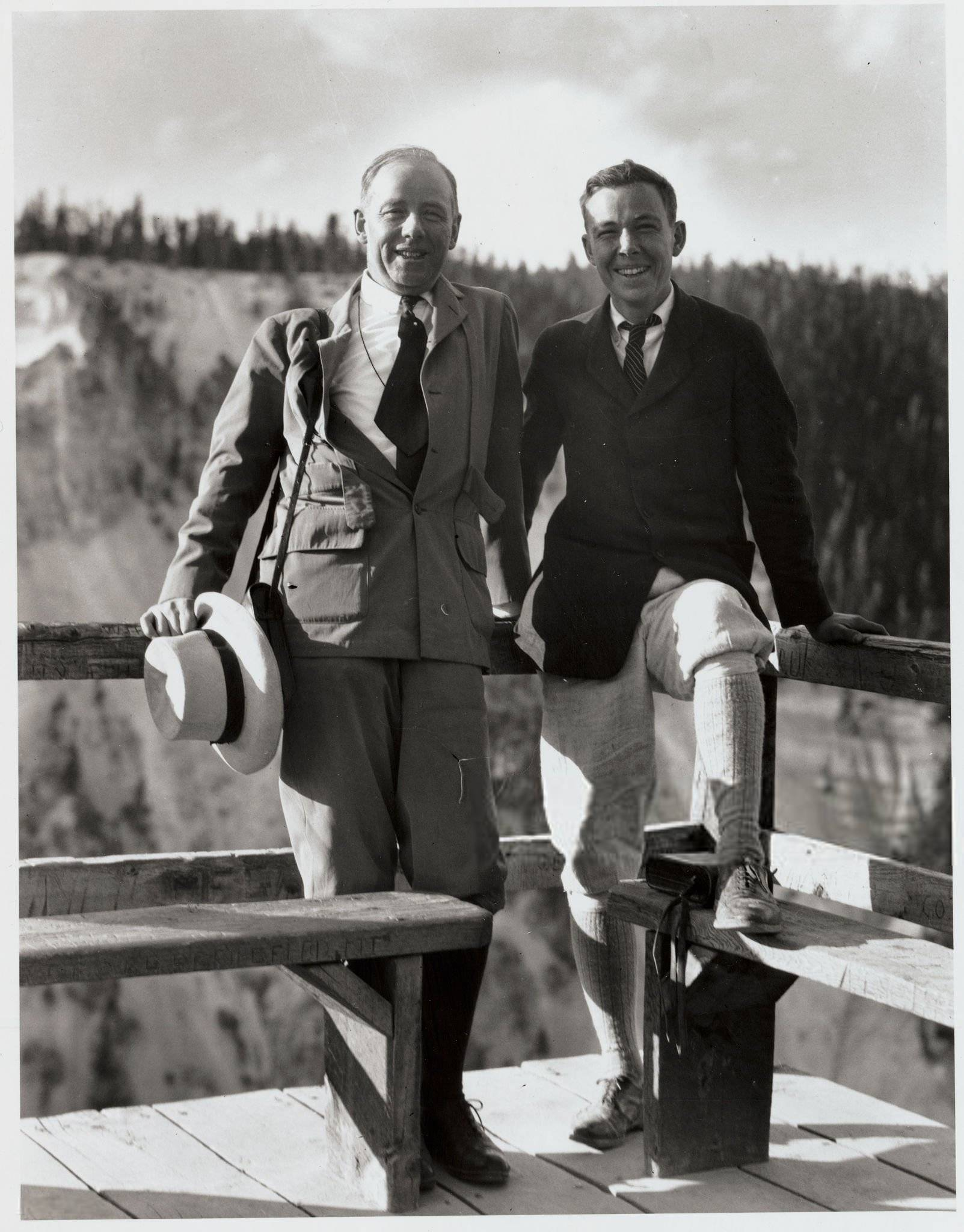
Lamont (right) with his father Thomas at Artist Point in Yellowstone National Park, August 15, 1922

Lamont was born in Englewood, New Jersey, on March 28, 1902. He was the son of Florence Haskell (Corliss) and Thomas W. Lamont, a partner and later chairman at J.P. Morgan & Co. Lamont graduated as valedictorian of Phillips Exeter Academy in 1920, and magna cum laude from Harvard University in 1924. The principles that animated his life were first evidenced at Harvard, where he attacked university clubs as snobbery. In 1924, he did graduate work at New College, Oxford, where he roomed with Julian Huxley. The next year Lamont began graduate studies at Columbia University, where he studied under John Dewey. In 1928, he became a philosophy instructor there. He received his Ph.D. in philosophy in 1932 from Columbia. Lamont taught at Columbia, Cornell, Harvard, and the New School for Social Research.

=== 1930s ===
Lamont became a radical in the 1930s, moved by the Great Depression. He wrote a book about the Soviet Union and praised what he saw there: "The people are better dressed, food is good and plentiful, everyone seems confident, happy and full of spirit". He was even onetime chairman of the Friends of the Soviet Union. He became critical of the Soviets over time, but always thought their achievement in transforming a feudal society remarkable, even as he attacked its treatment of political dissent and lack of civil liberties. Lamont's political views were Marxist and socialist for much of his life.

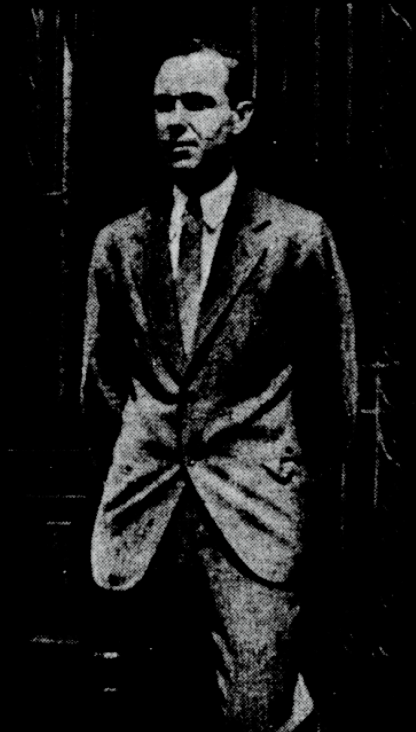
Lamont in 1934, from the Charleston Daily Mail article "Why Rich Young Men Are Going 'Left'."

Lamont began his 30 years as a director of the American Civil Liberties Union (ACLU) in 1932. In 1934, he was arrested while on a picket line in Jersey City, New Jersey, part of a long battle between labor and civil rights activists and Frank Hague, the city's mayor. Lamont later wrote that he "learned more about the American legal system in one day ... than in one year at Harvard Law School".

In 1936, Lamont helped found and subsidized the magazine Marxist Quarterly. When the Dewey Commission reported in 1937 that the Moscow trials of Leon Trotsky and others were fraudulent, Lamont, along with other left-wing intellectuals, refused to accept the commission's findings. Under the influence of the Popular Front, Lamont and 150 other left-wing writers endorsed Josef Stalin's actions as necessary for "the preservation of progressive democracy". Their letter warned that Dewey's work was itself politically motivated and charged Dewey with supporting reactionary views and "Red-baiting". Lamont wrote an introduction to the anti-Polish pamphlet Behind the Polish-Soviet Break by Alter Brody.

=== 1940s ===
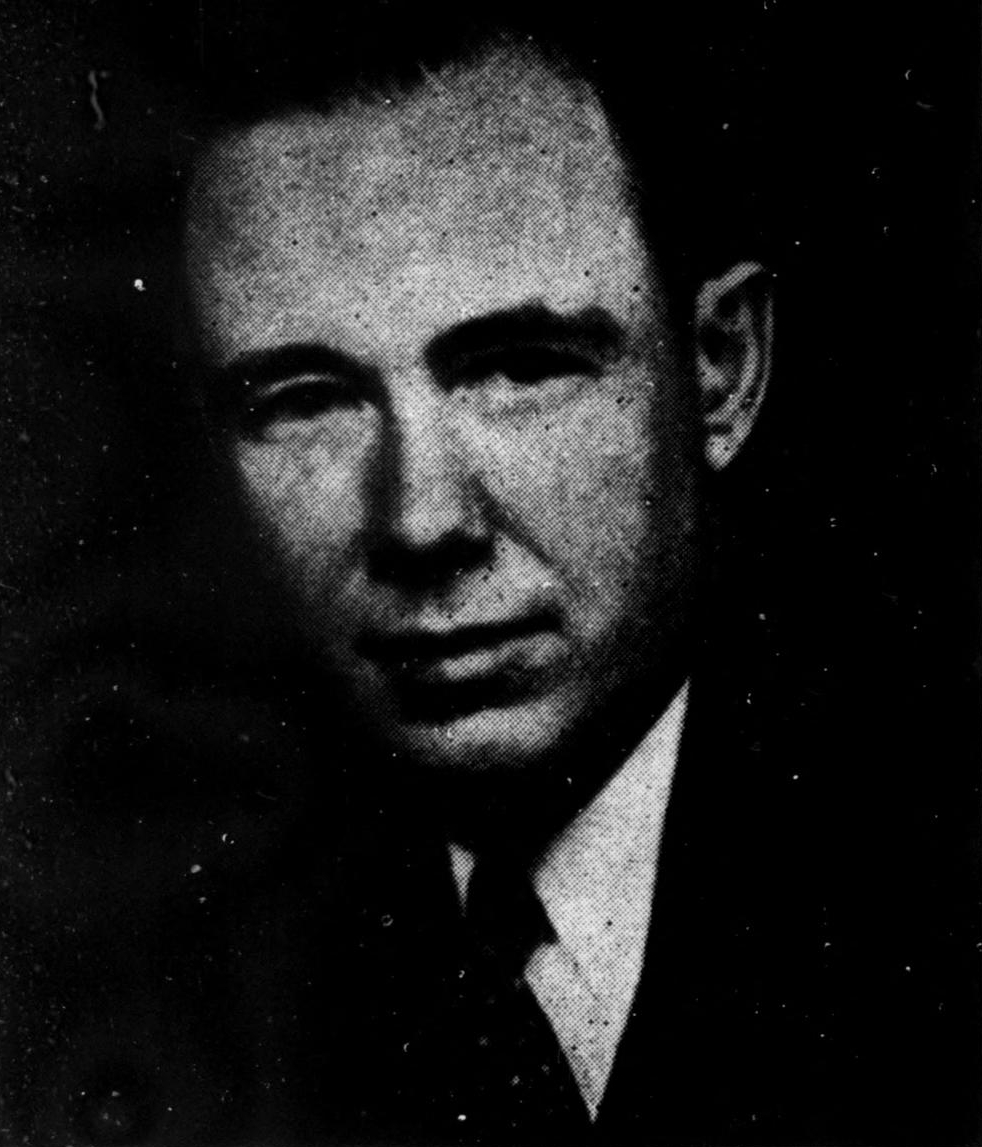
Lamont c. 1941

Lamont was a key founder of the National Council of American-Soviet Friendship (NCASF) (originally National Council on Soviet Relations or NCSR). Other founders included Professor Ralph Barton Perry of Harvard University and Edwin Seymour Smith. He served as its first chairman from 1943 to 1947.

Lamont remained sympathetic to the Soviet Union well after World War II and the establishment of satellite communist governments in Central and Eastern Europe. He authored a pamphlet entitled The Myth of Soviet Aggression in which he wrote:

The fact is, of course, that both the Truman and Eisenhower Administrations, in order to push their enormous armaments programs through Congress and to justify the continuation of the Cold War, have felt compelled to resort to the device of keeping the American people in a state of alarm over some alleged menace of Soviet or Communist origin.

In 1944 Lamont wrote a preface to a book by Alter Brody that popularized the Soviet falsification of the Katyn massacre in the West.

=== 1950s ===
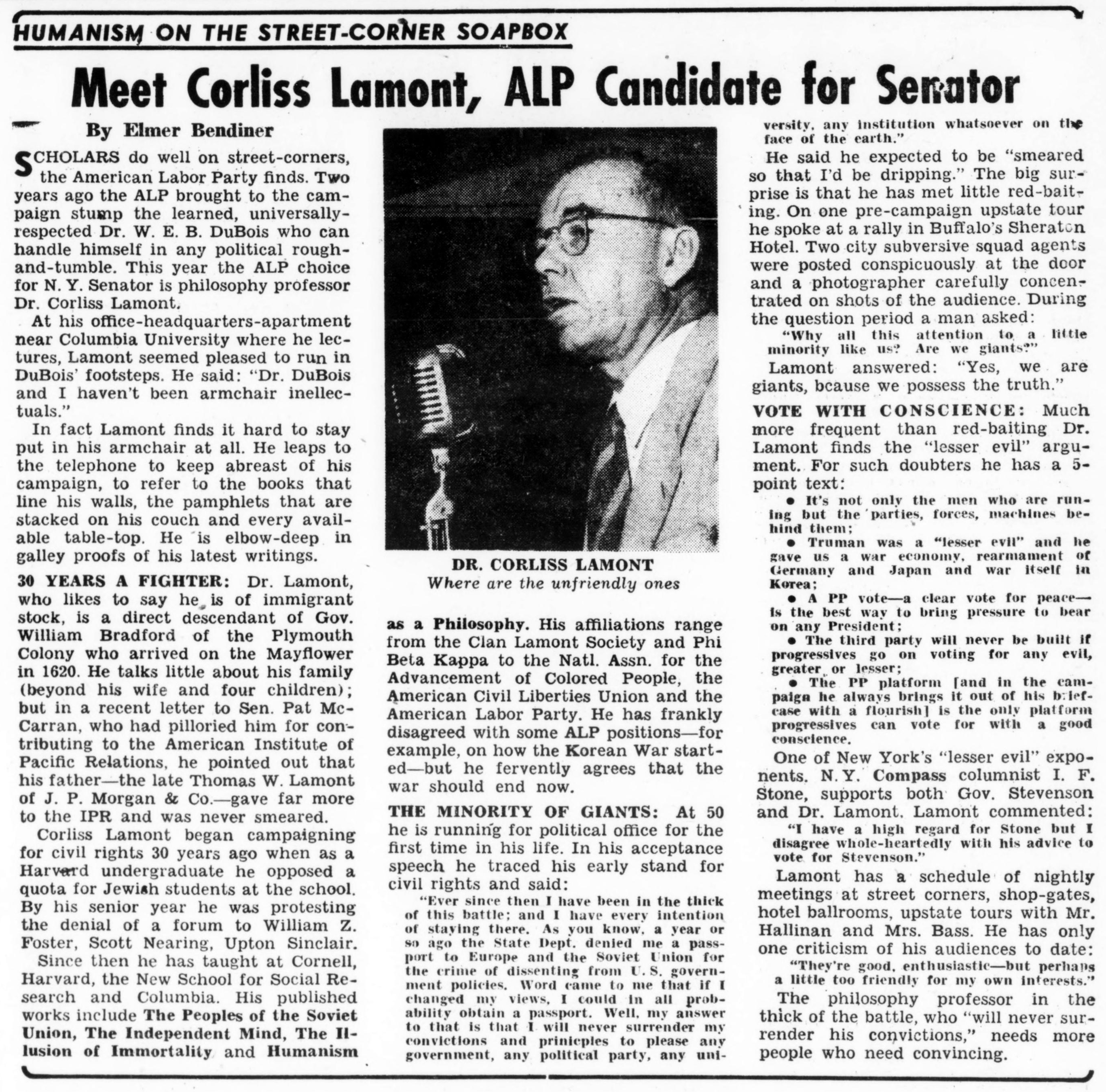
An article in the National Guardian by Elmer Bendiner detailing Lamont's Senate candidacy, October 9, 1952

Lamont ran for the U.S. Senate from New York, in 1952 on the American Labor ticket. He received 104,702 votes and lost to Republican Irving M. Ives.

When called to testify in front of Senator Joseph McCarthy's Senate Permanent Subcommittee on Investigations in 1953, he denied ever having been a communist, but refused to discuss his beliefs or those of others, citing not the Fifth Amendment but the First Amendment's guarantee of free speech. The committee cited Lamont for contempt of Congress by a vote of 71 to 3 in August 1954. Some senators questioned McCarthy's authority and wanted a federal court to rule on it. In November, Lamont donated $50,000 to create a $1,000,000 Bill of Rights Fund to support civil rights advocates, citing anti-communist legislation, travel restrictions, and blacklisting in the entertainment industry. The same month, he challenged the subcommittee's authority in court.

The same year, he wrote Why I Am Not a Communist. Despite his allegiance to Marxism, he never joined the Communist Party USA, and supported the Korean War.

In April 1955, Lamont withdrew from his role as a philosophy lecturer at Columbia University pending the outcome of these legal proceedings, and the university said it was Lamont's decision, made "without prior suggestion by any officer of the university". Judge Edward Weinfeld of the U.S. District Court found the indictment against Lamont was faulty, but the government, rather than seek a new indictment, appealed that ruling. A unanimous panel of the Court of Appeals agreed in 1955 and in 1956 the government chose not to appeal to the Supreme Court.

As a director of the ACLU, Lamont had resisted attempts to purge the organization of communists and, in 1954, he resigned his position because he felt the ACLU had not supported him in the face of McCarthy's charges. The complete record of the legal proceedings in Lamont's case against the McCarthy subcommittee was published in 1957.

In 1951 and 1957, Lamont was denied a passport by the State Department, which considered his application incomplete because he refused to answer a question about membership in the Communist Party. He sued the State Department in June 1957 seeking a hearing on its action. He obtained his passport in June 1958 following a Supreme Court decision in another case, Kent v. Dulles, and left the U.S. for a world tour in March 1959.

He ran again for the U.S. Senate from New York in 1958 on the Independent-Socialist ticket. He received more than 49,000 votes out of more than 5,500,000 cast, losing to Republican Kenneth B. Keating.

In 1959, Lamont became an enthusiastic supporter of Fidel Castro and his revolutionary government in Cuba.

=== 1960s ===
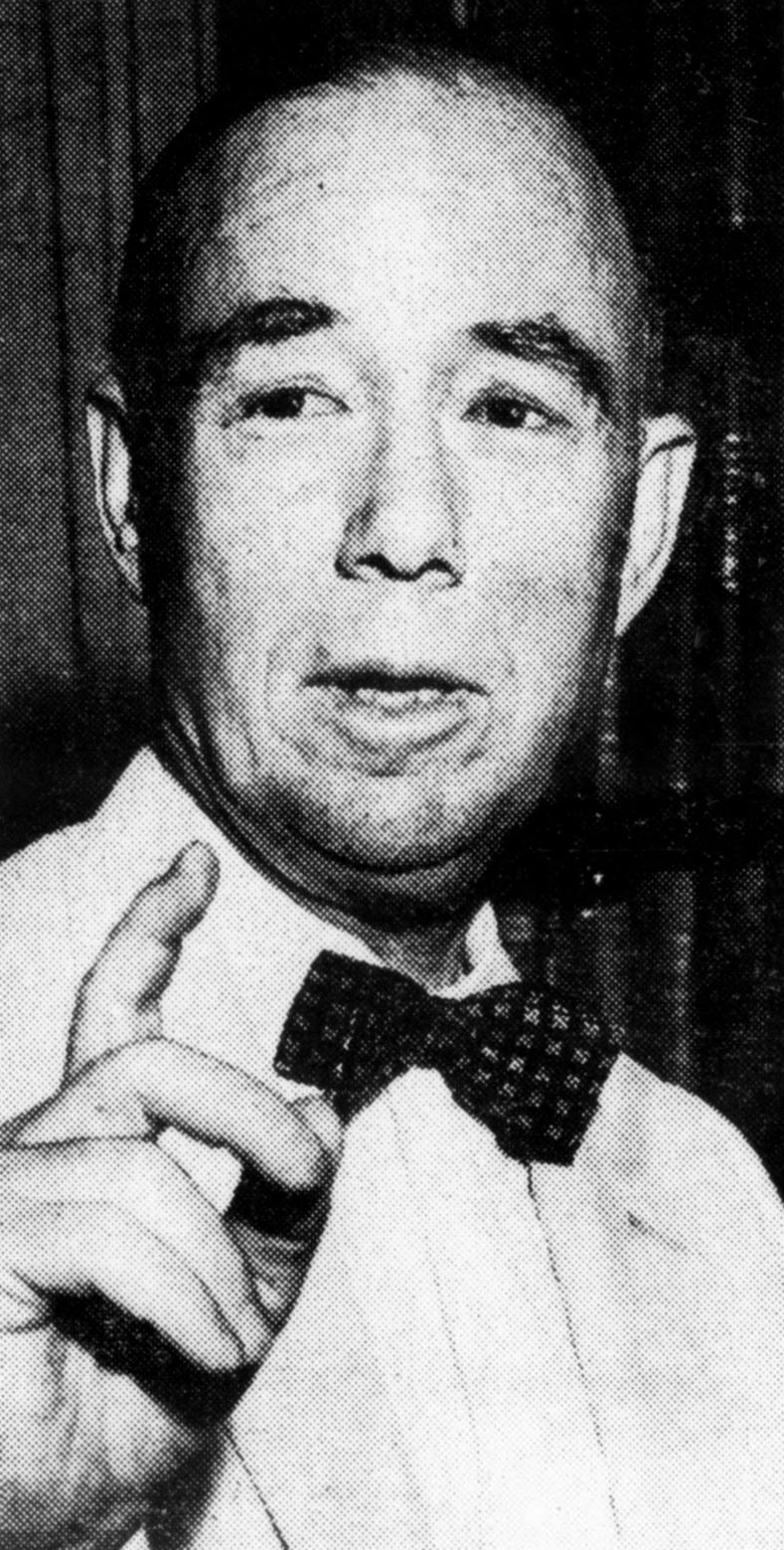
Lamont c. 1960

In 1964, Lamont sued the Postmaster General for reading and, at times, refusing to deliver his mail under the anti-propaganda mail law of 1962, passed over the objections of the Department of Justice and the Post Office, that allowed the Postmaster General to destroy "communist political propaganda" sent from outside the United States unless the addressee says he wants to receive such mail. The statute did not apply to sealed correspondence, but was aimed at published materials. He lost a 2–1 decision in U.S. District Court, after the Post Office delivered one such item of mail, and appealed to the Supreme Court, arguing that the single delivery was a subterfuge designed to moot his lawsuit while continuing to interrupt his mail service. On May 24, 1965, the Supreme Court held unanimously in Lamont v. Postmaster General that the law was unconstitutional.

It was the first time the Supreme Court invalidated a statute as a violation of the First Amendment's guarantee of freedom of speech. Lamont's attorney was Leonard B. Boudin, who worked on many civil liberties cases. He won a similar lawsuit against the Central Intelligence Agency in federal court the same year.

In the mid-1960s, Lamont became chairman of the National Emergency Civil Liberties Committee, a position he held until his death.

=== Later life ===
In 1971, after a congressman called him an "identified member of the Communist Party, U.S.A.", Lamont issued a statement that "although it is no disgrace to belong to the Communist party, I have never even dreamed of joining it." The same year, he financed Dorothy Day's visit to the Soviet Union and several other countries in Eastern Europe.

In 1979, Lamont founded Half-Moon Foundation, Inc. Half-Moon Foundation was a 501(c)(3) non-profit organization and was incorporated in the state of New York. The foundation was formed "to promote enduring international peace, support for the United Nations, the conservation of our country's natural environment, and to safeguard and extend civil liberties as guaranteed under the Constitution and the Bill of Rights."

Lamont was president emeritus of the American Humanist Association and in 1977 was named Humanist of the Year. In 1981, he received the Gandhi Peace Award.

In 1998, Lamont received a posthumous Distinguished Humanist Service Award from the International Humanist and Ethical Union and he was one of the signers of the Humanist Manifesto.

== Personal life and death ==
In 1928, Lamont married Margaret Hayes Irish. They divorced in the early 1960s. In 1962, he married Helen Boyden Lamb; she died of cancer in 1975. In 1986, Lamont married Beth Keehner; she survived his death. He died from heart failure at home in Ossining, New York, on April 26, 1995.

== Legacy ==
Following the deaths of his parents, Lamont became a philanthropist. He funded the collection and preservation of manuscripts of American philosophers, particularly George Santayana, as well as Rockwell Kent and John Masefield.

He became a substantial donor to both Harvard and Columbia, endowing the latter's "Corliss Lamont Professor of Civil Liberties."

He was the great-uncle of Ned Lamont, the governor of Connecticut.

== Writings ==
Lamont was a prolific author. He wrote, co-wrote, edited, or co-edited more than two dozen books and dozens of pamphlets, and wrote thousands of letters to newspapers, magazines, and journals on significant social issues during his lifelong campaign for peace and civil rights.

In 1935, he published The Illusion of Immortality (originally published in 1932 as Issues of Immortality: A Study in Implications), which was a revised version of his doctoral dissertation. Lamont argued that people can live satisfactory lives without belief in life after death and that human life may be recognized to be more precious if it is realized that it only comes once to each man.

His most famous work is The Philosophy of Humanism (originally published in 1949 as Humanism as a Philosophy), now in its eighth edition. He also published intimate portraits of John Dewey, John Masefield, and George Santayana.

=== Books authored or co-authored by Corliss Lamont ===
- A Humanist Funeral Service ISBN 0-87975-090-1 (revised by Beth K. Lamont and J. Sierra Oliva and republished in a Fourth Revised Edition in 2011 as A Humanist Funeral Service and Celebration ISBN 978-1-61614-409-8)
- A Humanist Wedding Service ISBN 0-87975-000-6 Third Revised Edition 1981 (Previous editions: 1972, 1970) 29 pages
- A Lifetime of Dissent (Buffalo, Prometheus Books, 1988, 414 pages) Library of Congress Catalog Card Number: 88-15100 ISBN 0-87975-463-X
- Freedom Is As Freedom Does: Civil Liberties in America (1956), foreword by Bertrand Russell, reprint Fourth ed. 1990, Continuum Publishing Company, ISBN 0-8264-0475-8; Third Printing, 1981 ISBN 0-8180-0350-2
- Freedom of Choice Affirmed Third Revised Edition 1990 (Previous editions: 1969, 1967) Library of Congress Catalog Card Number 67-27793 (Third Revised Edition) ISBN 0-8264-0476-6 (Third Revised Edition)
- Lover's Credo: Poems of Love (1972), 1983 edition: ISBN 0-87233-068-0, 1994: William L. Bauhan, ISBN 0-87233-114-8, Online version in HTML format
- Remembering John Masefield Revised Edition 1991 (Previous edition: 1971) Introduction by Judith Masefield, Library of Congress Catalog Card Number 91-4429 ISBN 0-8264-0478-2
- Russia Day by Day: A Travel Diary (Co-authored with Margaret Lamont) (New York, Covici Friede, 1933)
- Soviet Civilization (New York, Philosophical Library, 1952; second edition 1955), Dedicated to Albert Rhys Williams
- Illusion of Immortality, introduction by John Dewey, (1935), 5th edition 1990, Continuum Publishing Company, ISBN 0-8044-6377-8 (originally published in 1932 as Issues of Immortality: A Study in Implications)
- The Independent Mind: Essays of a Humanist Philosopher (New York, Horizon Press, 1951, 187 pages)
- The Peoples of the Soviet Union (New York, Harcourt, Brace and Company, 1946)
- The Philosophy of Humanism, (1949), 1965 edition: Ungar Pub Co ISBN 0-8044-5595-3, 7th rev. edition 1990: Continuum Publishing Company, ISBN 0-8044-6379-4, 8th rev. edition (with gender neutral references by editors Beverley Earles and Beth K. Lamont) 1997 Humanist Press ISBN 0-931779-07-3, Online version in Adobe Acrobat PDF format (originally published in 1949 as Humanism as a Philosophy)
- Voice in the Wilderness: Collected Essays of Fifty Years (Buffalo, Prometheus Books, 1974, 327 pages) Library of Congress Catalog Card Number: 74-75351 ISBN 0-87975-060-X
- Yes to Life: Memoirs of Corliss Lamont (1981), Horizon Press: ISBN 0-8180-0232-8, rev. edition 1991: ISBN 0-8264-0477-4 Library of Congress Catalog Card Number 91–4430
- You Might Like Socialism: A Way of Life for Modern Man, (1939), (published with a re-introduction by Beth K. Lamont as Lefties Are In Their Right Minds on May 18, 2009, by Half-Moon Foundation, Inc. ISBN 978-0-578-00782-3 Online PDF version

=== Books edited or co-edited by Corliss Lamont ===
- Albert Rhys Williams, September 28, 1883 - February 27, 1962: In Memoriam (1962, New York, Horizon Press)
- Collected Poems of John Reed (Edited and with a foreword by Corliss Lamont) (Westport, Conn., Lawrence Hill & Company, 1985)
- "Dear Corliss": Letters from Eminent Persons (Buffalo, Prometheus Books, 1990, 202 pages)
- Dialogue on George Santayana (Edited by Corliss Lamont with the assistance of Mary Redmer) (New York, Horizon Press, 1959)
- Dialogue on John Dewey (Edited by Corliss Lamont with the assistance of Mary Redmer) (New York, Horizon Press, 1959)
- Helen Lamb Lamont: A Memorial Tribute (New York, Horizon Press, 1976)
- Letters of John Masefield to Florence Lamont (Edited by Corliss Lamont and Lansing Lamont) (New York, Columbia University Press, 1979, ISBN 978-0231047067; New York, Palgrave Macmillan, 1980, ISBN 978-0333257555)
- Man Answers Death: An Anthology of Poetry With an Introduction by Louis Untermeyer (New York, Philosophical Library, 1952)
- Studies on India and Vietnam (Written by Helen B. Lamb and Edited by Corliss Lamont) (New York, Monthly Review Press, 1976, ISBN 978-0853453840)
- The Thomas Lamonts in America with Recollections and Poems by John Masefield (originally published in 1962 as The Thomas Lamont Family) (Cranbury, New Jersey, A. S. Barns and Co., Inc. and London, England, Thomas Yoseloff Ltd, 1971, ISBN 0-498-07882-5)
- The Trial of Elizabeth Gurley Flynn by the American Civil Liberties Union (Edited and with an Introduction by Corliss Lamont) (New York, Horizon Press, 1968) (Modern Reader/Monthly Review Press, 1969)

=== Basic Pamphlets series ===
Aside from books, over the course of more than a half-century, Corliss Lamont authored, co-authored, or edited approximately three dozen pamphlets on a variety of subjects. Prominent among these was the Basic Pamphlets series, privately published by Dr. Lamont and sold directly by him through mail order via a local post office box in New York. There were 29 numbered titles in the Basic Pamphlets series, listed below by pamphlet number.

1. Are We Being Talked Into War? (1952)
2. The Civil Liberties Crisis (1952)
3. The Humanist Tradition (1952, 16 pages - Second Printing, 1955)
4. Effects of American Foreign Policy (1952, 40 pages)
5. Back to the Bill of Rights
6. The Myth of Soviet Aggression (Second, revised edition, December 1953, 16 pages)
7. Challenge to McCarthy (February 1954, 32 pages)
8. The Congressional Inquisition (May 1954, 36 pages)
9. The Assault on Academic Freedom (1955)
10. The Right to Travel (December 1957, 44 pages)
11. To End Nuclear Bomb Tests [Co-authored by Margaret I. Lamont] (1958, 44 pages)
12. A Peace Program for the U.S.A. (1959, 24 pages - Second printing, March 1959)
13. My Trip Around The World (1960, 48 pages)
14. The Crime Against Cuba [Mary Redmer, Editor] (June 1961, 40 pages)
15. My First Sixty Years (1962, 52 pages - Second printing, February 1963)
16. The Enduring Impact of George Santayana (1964)
17. The Tragedy of Vietnam: Where Do We Go from Here? [Authored by Helen Boyden Lamont née Helen B. Lamb] (1964, 50 pages)
18. Vietnam: Corliss Lamont vs. Ambassador Lodge (1967, 32 pages)
19. How To Be Happy — Though Married (1973, 24 pages)
20. The Meaning of Vietnam and Cambodia [Co-authored by Helen Lamb Lamont] (1975)
21. Trip to Communist China — An Informal Report (1976, 28 pages)
22. Adventures In Civil Liberties (1977, 28 pages)
23. Immortality: Myth Or Reality? (1978, 36 pages)
24. Resolute Radical At 83 - later published as Steadfast Activist at 84 (1985, 40 pages)
25. The Right to Know: The Civil Liberties Campaign Against Secrecy in Government [Corliss Lamont, Editor] (December 1986, 40 pages)
26. Jesus As A Free Speech Victim: Trial by Terror 2000 Years Ago [Authored by Clifford J. Durr, Introduction by Corliss Lamont, published on behalf of the National Emergency Civil Liberties Committee (NECLC)] (Fourth Edition, 1987, 24 pages)
27. The Assurance Of Free Choice (September 1987, 40 pages)
28. Panama—Operation Injustice [Compiled and Written by Corliss Lamont and Beth Lamont] (1990, 16 pages)
29. Persian Gulf Crisis—UN Peace Negotiations; No To War! [Written and Edited by Corliss Lamont and Beth Lamont] (1990, 24 pages)

=== Other pamphlets ===
In addition to the Basic Pamphlets series, Corliss Lamont also wrote a number of other pamphlets, a partial list of which appears below.

- On Understanding Soviet Russia (New York, Friends of the Soviet Union, 1934, 32 pages) Online PDF version
- Socialist Planning in Soviet Russia (New York, Friends of the Soviet Union, 1935, 40 pages)
- Soviet Russia and Religion (New York, International Pamphlets, 1936, 24 pages)
- Soviet Russia versus Nazi Germany: A study in contrasts (New York, The American Council on Soviet Relations, First Edition August 1941 - Second Edition March 1942, 52 pages)
- Soviet Russia and the Post-War World (New York, National Council of American-Soviet Friendship, First Edition May 1943 - Second Edition May 1944, 36 pages)
- Soviet Aggression: Myth or Reality? (New York, self-published, June 1951, 16 pages)
- Why I am not a Communist (New York, self-published, January 1952, 20 pages)

=== Sound recordings ===
- Author Corliss Lamont Sings For His Family & Friends, a Medley of Favorite Hit Songs from American Musicals includes 36 musical selections (Smithsonian Folkways, 1977, Stock Number FW03567)

=== Videos ===
- "Corliss Lamont and Pete Seeger" (1992, run time 00:10:05) by Jonathan Heap (a grandchild of Lamont) (MP4)

== See also ==
- American philosophy
- Humanist Manifesto
- Religious humanism
- Frederick Vanderbilt Field
- List of American philosophers
- National Council of American-Soviet Friendship
- American Civil Liberties Union
- National Emergency Civil Liberties Committee
