= LaMonte =

LaMonte, Lamonte or La Monte may refer to the following people:

== Surname ==
- Bob LaMonte, American sports agent
- Collene Lamonte, American politician from Michigan
- Francesca LaMonte (1895–1982), American ichthyologist
- Karen LaMonte (born 1967), American artist
- George M. La Monte (1863–1927), American businessman, philanthropist, and politician

== Given name ==
- Lamonte McLemore (born 1939), member of the American vocal group The 5th Dimension
- LaMonte Ulmer (born 1986), American professional basketball player
- LaMonte Wade Jr. (born 1994), American baseball player
- La Monte Young (born 1935), American musician and artist

== See also ==
- Lamonte trevallis, a trace fossil

== See also ==
- Lamont (disambiguation)
- Monte (disambiguation)
