= James Lamont (footballer) =

Scottish footballer

Personal information
- Full name: James Lamont
- Date of birth: 1875
- Place of birth: Cowlairs, Scotland
- Position: Half back

Senior career*
Years	Team	Apps	(Gls)
1898–1899	Bedminster	25	(0)
1899–1900	Bristol Rovers	27	(2)
- * Club domestic league appearances and goals

James Lamont (born 1875, date of death unknown) was a Scottish professional footballer who played in the 19th century for Bedminster and Bristol Rovers.

Lamont was born in Cowlairs in Scotland playing for Partick Thistle. Moving south he played for Bedminster in 1898–99, one of the teams that later merged to form Bristol City, in the Southern League before joining Bristol Rovers in 1899. In his one season with Rovers he played 27 times as a half back in the then-professional Southern League, scoring twice.

== Sources ==
- Byrne, Stephen; Jay, Mike (2003). Bristol Rovers Football Club – The Definitive History 1883-2003. Stroud: Tempus. p. 491. ISBN 0-7524-2717-2.
