= Peter Lamont (footballer) =

Scottish footballer

Peter Lamont is a former footballer. He played for Alloa Athletic for whom he was the leading goalscorer in 1989–1990. In 2005, he came third in a fans' poll run by Football Focus to find Alloa's all-time cult hero. He also played for Clydebank, Cowdenbeath and East Stirlingshire in the Scottish Football League. After retiring, he coached for a time at Wolves Boys Club (Glasgow).
