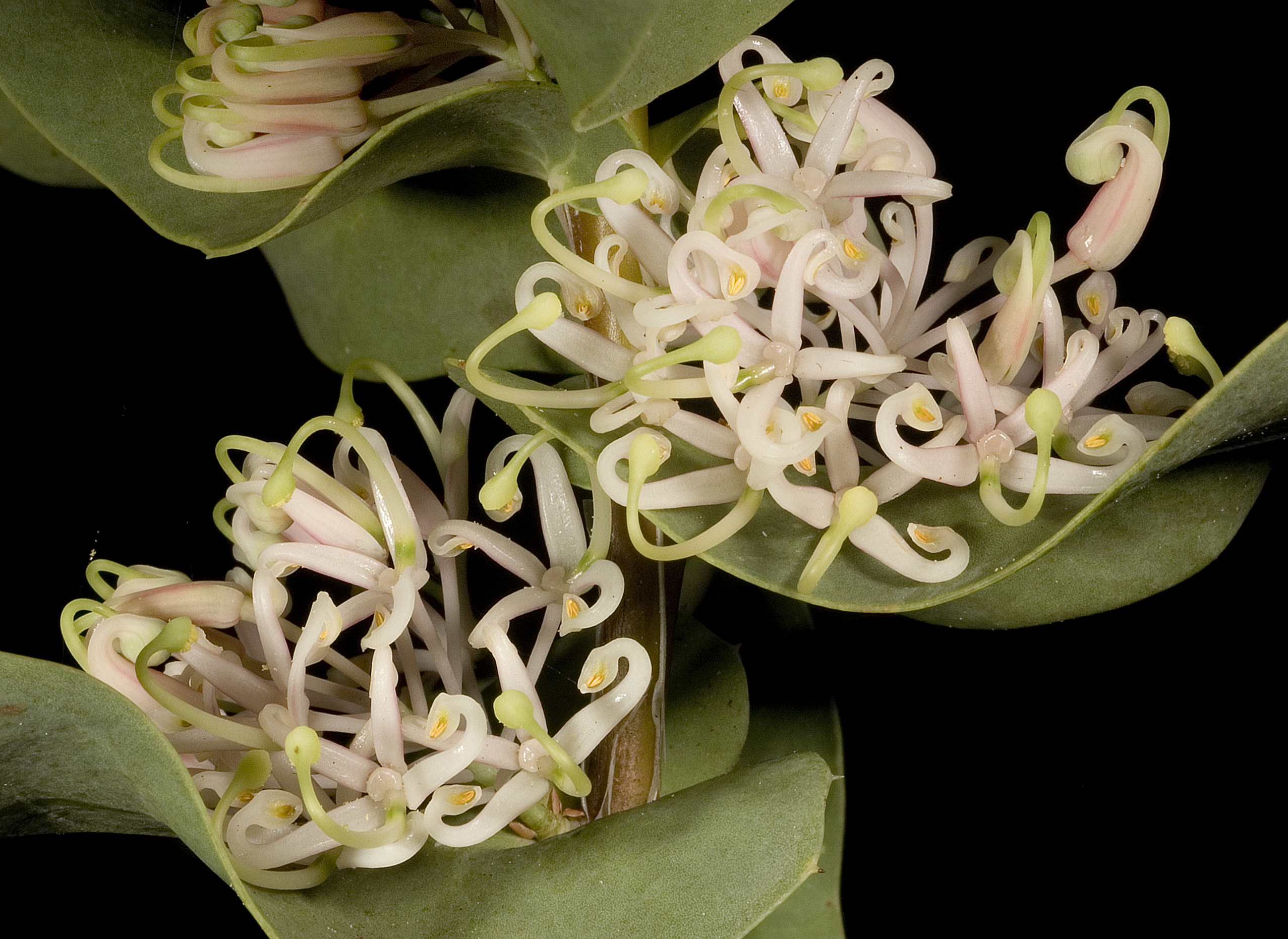

Conservation status
- Least Concern (IUCN 3.1)

Scientific classification
- Kingdom: Plantae
- Clade: Tracheophytes
- Clade: Angiosperms
- Clade: Eudicots
- Order: Proteales
- Family: Proteaceae
- Genus: Hakea
- Species: H. prostrata

Binomial name
- Hakea prostrata R.Br.
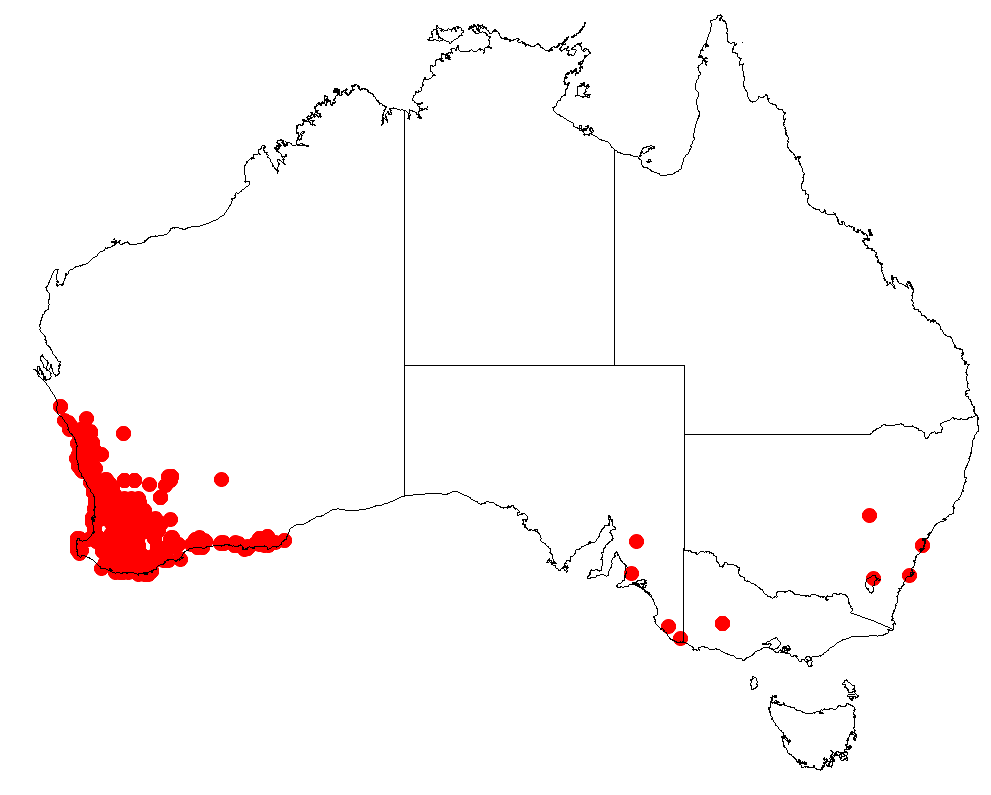
- Occurrence data from Australasian Virtual Herbarium

Synonyms
- Hakea glabella R.Br.

= Hakea prostrata =

Harsh hakea

Species of shrub endemic to Western Australia

Hakea prostrata, commonly known as harsh hakea, is a species of shrub that is endemic to the south-west of Western Australia. It is a low-lying shrub with prickly leaves and groups of white or cream-coloured flowers in late winter and early spring.

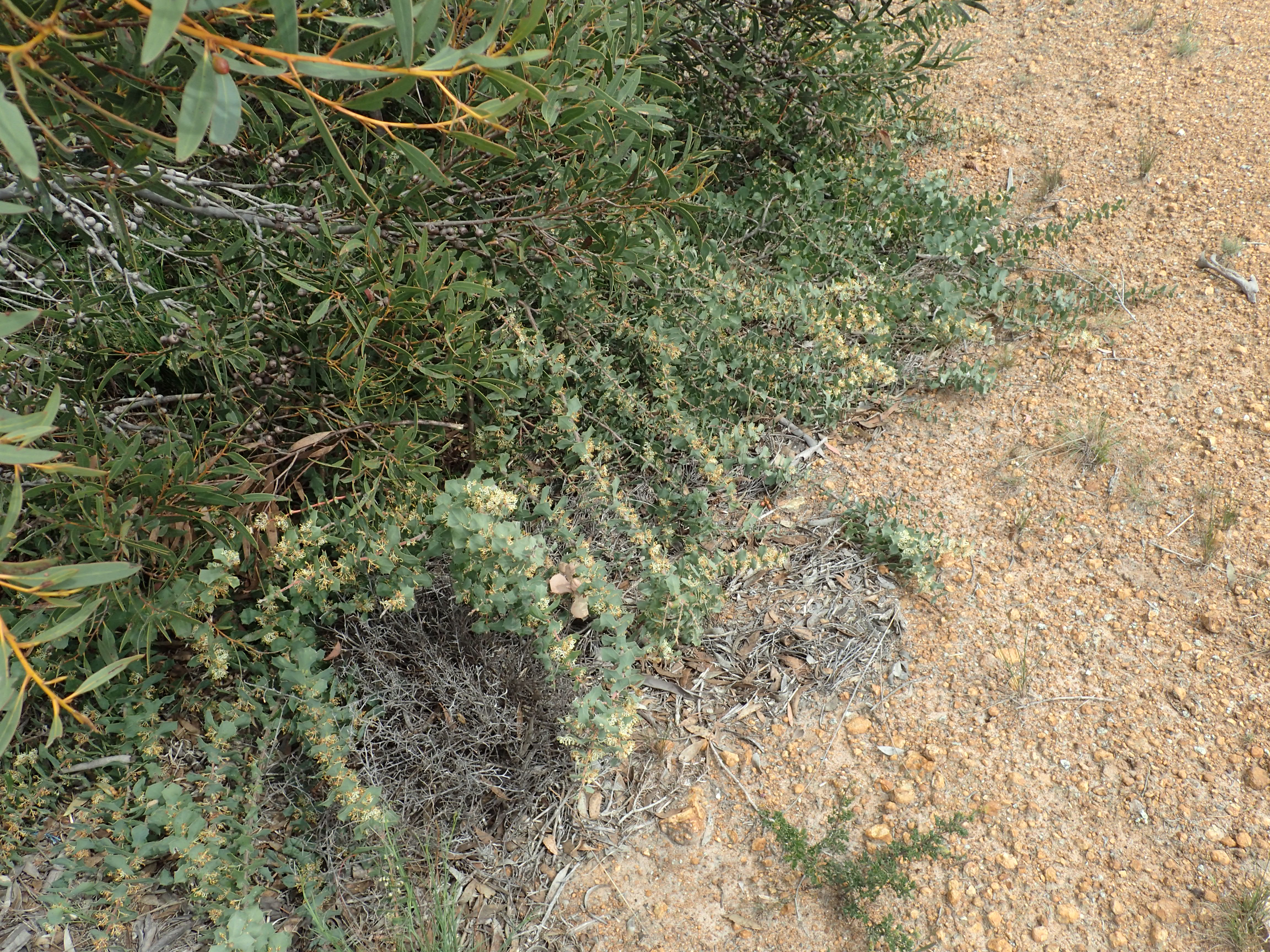
Harsh hakea habit

== Description ==
Hakea prostrata is a shrub which grows to between 1–3 m (3–10 ft) in height with spreading branchlets. The oblong-obovate stem-clasping leaves have prickly edges and a central vein. Plentiful sweetly scented white or cream flowers are produced in axillary racemose inflorescences between July and October in its native range.

== Taxonomy and naming ==
Hakea prostrata was first formally described in 1810 by botanist Robert Brown and published the description in Transactions of the Linnean Society of London. The specific epithet (prostrata) is a Latin word meaning "down flat", "overthrown" or "laid low", referring to the low growing, coastal form of this plant.

== Distribution and habitat ==
Harsh hakea is found from Geraldton to Esperance. It grows on hillsides, in shallow soil on granite outcrops, and stabilised sand dunes.

== Conservation status ==
Hakea prostrata is classified as "not threatened" by the Western Australian Government.
