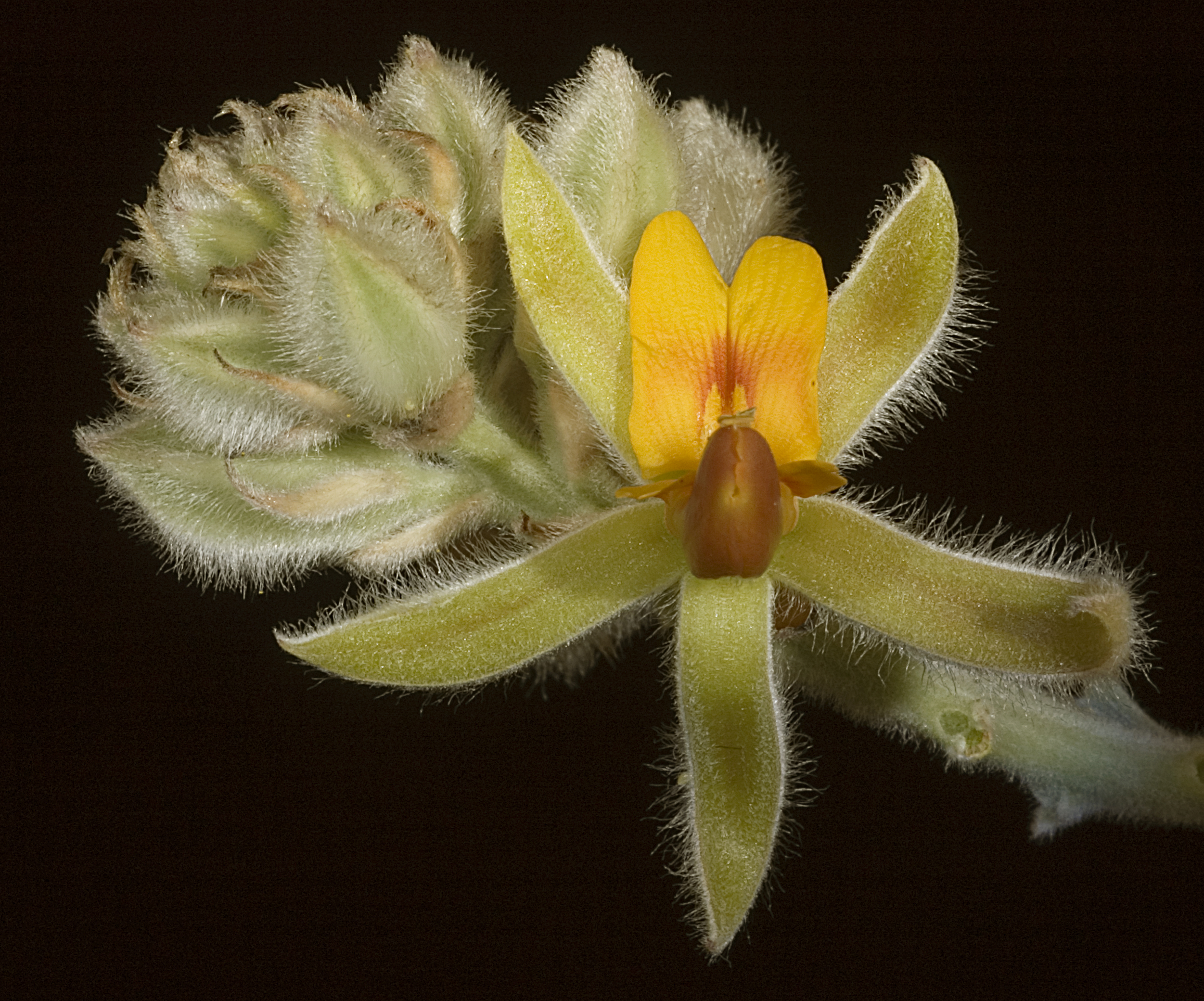

Scientific classification
- Kingdom: Plantae
- Clade: Tracheophytes
- Clade: Angiosperms
- Clade: Eudicots
- Clade: Rosids
- Order: Fabales
- Family: Fabaceae
- Subfamily: Faboideae
- Genus: Jacksonia
- Species: J. floribunda

Binomial name
- Jacksonia floribunda Endl.

Synonyms
- Jacksonia decumbens E.Pritz.; Jacksonia densiflora Benth. ex Lindl.; Jacksonia densiflora Benth. ex Lindl. var. densiflora; Jacksonia densiflora var. laxiflora Benth.; Piptomeris densiflora (Benth. ex Lindl.) Greene; Piptomeris floribunda (Endl.) Greene

= Jacksonia floribunda =

Species of legume

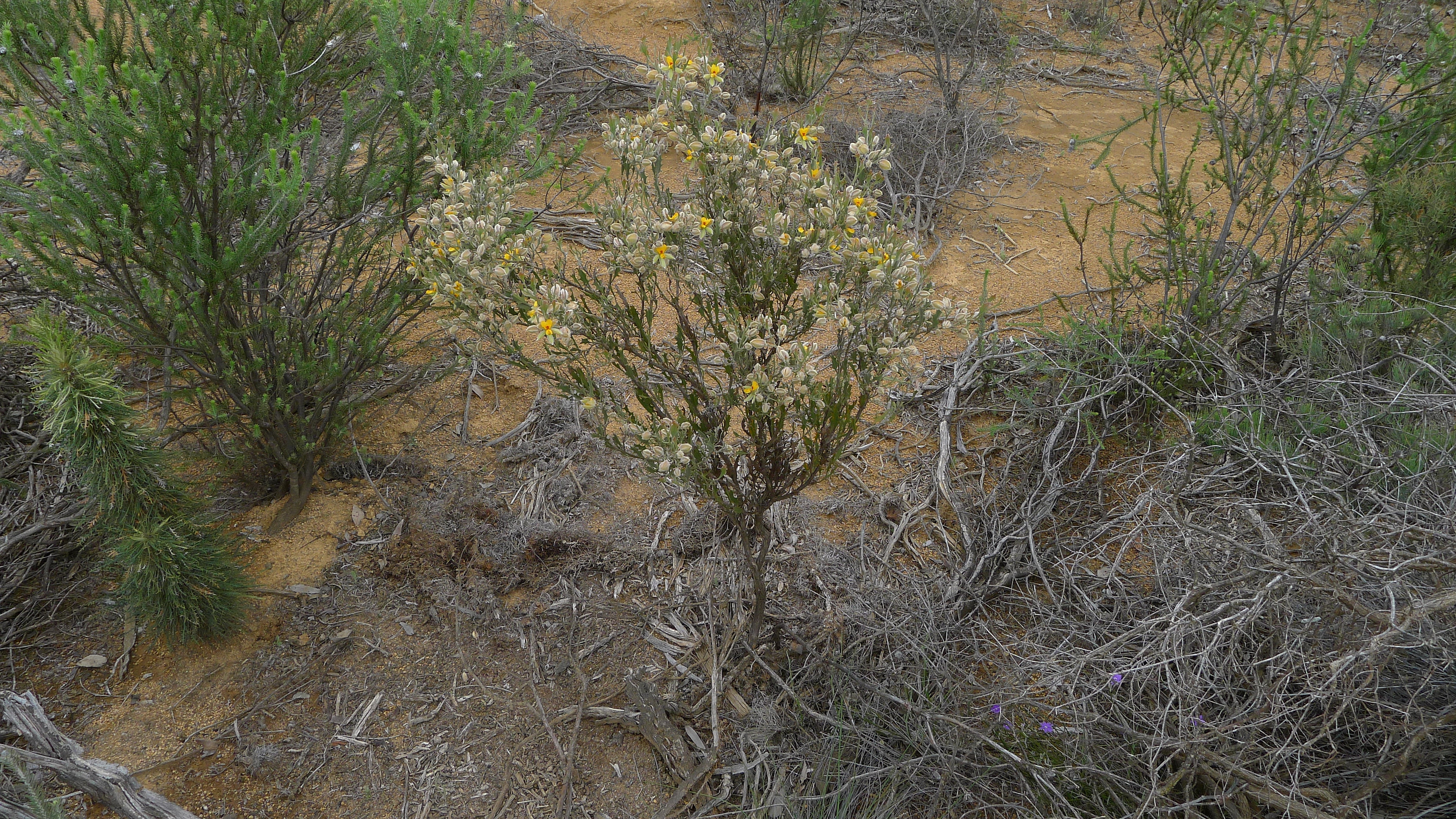
Habit in the Boyagin Nature Reserve

Jacksonia floribunda, commonly known as holly pea, is a species of flowering plant in the family Fabaceae and is endemic to the south-west of Western Australia. It is a prostrate, low-lying, erect or upright shrub with egg-shaped, elliptic or oblong phylloclades with sharply-pointed lobes, leaves reduced to scales and yellow-orange flowers with red markings in long, dense clusters, with scale leaves at the base.

== Description ==
Jacksonia floribunda is a prostrate, low-lying, erect or upright shrub that typically grows up to 0.05–4 m (2.0 in – 13 ft 1.5 in) high and 0.4–3 m (1 ft 4 in – 9 ft 10 in) wide. It has prominently ribbed branches, the end branches egg-shaped, elliptic or oblong phylloclades, its leaves reduced to broadly egg-shaped to round scales, 2.2–9 mm (0.087–0.354 in) long and 1.5–3 mm (0.059–0.118 in) wide. The flowers are arranged in long clusters with scale leaves at the base, each flower on a pedicel 1.6–9 mm (0.063–0.354 in) long, with bracteoles 3.0–7.5 mm (0.12–0.30 in) long and 0.5–2.5 mm (0.020–0.098 in) wide but that fall off as the flowers open. The floral tube is 0.75–2.0 mm (0.030–0.079 in) long and not ribbed, the sepals are membraneous to papery and brittle, the lobes 10.5–20 mm (0.41–0.79 in) long, 1.8–4.6 mm (0.071–0.181 in) wide and fused at the base. The standard petal is yellow-orange with red markings, 7.5–10.3 mm (0.30–0.41 in) long and 5.4–11 mm (0.21–0.43 in) deep, the wings yellow-orange with red markings, 8.0–8.3 mm (0.31–0.33 in) long, and the keel is usually purplish-red and 6.2–6.4 mm (0.24–0.25 in) long. The stamens have pink filaments and are 7.0–9.7 mm (0.28–0.38 in) long. Flowering occurs from October to March, and the fruit is a woody, hairy pod 11.2–14.9 mm (0.44–0.59 in) long and 4.5–7.2 mm (0.18–0.28 in) wide.

== Taxonomy ==
Jacksonia floribunda was first formally described in 1838 by Stephan Endlicher in his Stirpium Australasicarum Herbarii Hugeliani Decades Tres from specimens collected between King George Sound and the Swan River Colony by John Septimus Roe. The specific epithet (floribunda) means 'flowering profusely'.

== Distribution and habitat ==
This species of Jacksonia grows in shrubland or woodland in deep sand over Laterite and is widespread from north of Geraldton to south of Perth and inland as far as Corrigin in the Avon Wheatbelt, Geraldton Sandplains, Jarrah Forest and Swan Coastal Plain bioregions of south-western Western Australia.

== Conservation status ==
This species is listed as "not threatened" by the Government of Western Australia Department of Biodiversity, Conservation and Attractions.
