= Charles Fish =

American educator

Charles Everett Fish

6th Principal of Phillips Exeter Academy
- In office 1890–1895
- Preceded by: Walter Quincy Scott
- Succeeded by: Harlan Page Amen

Personal details
- Born: May 26, 1854 Cotuit, Massachusetts, U.S.
- Died: October 23, 1916 (aged 62) Amesbury, Massachusetts, U.S.
- Education: Harvard College

Charles Everett Fish (May 26, 1854 – October 23, 1916) was an American educator and the sixth principal of Phillips Exeter Academy.

Fish was born in Cotuit, Massachusetts, on May 26, 1854, to John C. and Lavarah Fish. He attended school at Exeter's rival Phillips Academy Andover, then entered Harvard College, as a member of the class of 1878. However, in order to raise money for his sister's education, he left after his freshman year to become the principal of Edward Little High School, in Auburn, Maine, returning to Harvard in 1879 to graduate in 1880. Following his graduation, he became the principal of Chicopee High School in Chicopee, Massachusetts, for five years. He then opened a private all-boys private school in Worcester, Massachusetts, before being elected in 1890 as the principal of Exeter, based on the recommendations of his former students' parents. Under him, a new dormitory, Soule Hall, named for principal Gideon Lane Soule, was built, and fraternities were abolished in 1891, though they were eventually reintroduced following his departure. He resigned after five years in 1895 with a gift of $4000 from the board of trustees, moving to Waban, Newton, Massachusetts, to open Waban School, before closing it down in four years to become the principal of Rhineland School for Girls in Poughkeepsie, New York. He went on to teach in Boston, Massachusetts and Scranton, Pennsylvania, as well as serve as the superintendent of schools in Manchester-by-the-Sea, Amesbury, and Merrimac, Massachusetts.

He died on October 23, 1916, in Amesbury. He was married to Mellie Rowe, a former student of his, in Auburn, Maine, in 1878. With her, he had five children. He was awarded an honorary Master of Arts degree by Dartmouth College in 1891.
