= Albert Perkins =

American lawyer

Albert Cornelius Perkins

4th Principal of Phillips Exeter Academy
- In office 1873–1883
- Preceded by: Gideon Lane Soule
- Succeeded by: Walter Quincy Scott

Personal details
- Born: December 18, 1833 Topsfield, Massachusetts, U.S.
- Died: September 22, 1896 (aged 62) Brooklyn, New York, U.S.
- Education: Dartmouth College

Albert Cornelius Perkins (December 18, 1833 – September 22, 1896) was an American educator and fourth principal of Phillips Exeter Academy and fourth principal of Adelphi University.

Albert Perkins was born on 1833 in Topsfield, Massachusetts to Nehemiah and Lydiah Perkins. He was a descendant of Thomas Dudley and Simon Bradstreet, two governors of the Massachusetts Bay Colony, and was the brother to John W. Perkins, the principal of The Governor's Academy and superintendent of the City of Salem public school system. He entered Exeter's rival school Phillips Academy in 1852, where he graduated and entered Dartmouth College, where he in turn graduated in 1859 with an A.M. degree. At Dartmouth, he was a member of the Psi Upsilon fraternity. He then went to Andover to teach for two years, after which he left to practice law for a year in Salem, Massachusetts. He then taught at Peabody High School in modern-day Peabody. In 1863, he became principal of Oliver High School in Lawrence. After two years as principal, he was elected principal of Exeter. Under his administration, the newspaper the Exonian, the oldest continually published secondary school newspaper in the United States, was established. In 1879, he was awarded a PhD degree from Dartmouth. He resigned in 1883 to become principal of Adelphi University in Brooklyn, New York, a position from which he resigned in 1892. Following his time at Adelphi, he opened a private school in Brooklyn, and was offered a professorship from Dartmouth. In Brooklyn, he worked as a civil service commissioner from 1894 to 1896.

Perkins was married Caroline Cleveland in Topsfield, with whom he had four children—a son and three daughters. He died on September 22, 1896, in Brooklyn.
