= William Saltonstall =

American educator and author 1905–1989

William Gurdon Saltonstall

8th Principal of Phillips Exeter Academy
- In office 1946–1963
- Preceded by: Lewis Perry
- Succeeded by: W. Ernest Gillespie (interim); Richard Ward Day

Personal details
- Born: November 11, 1905 Milton, Massachusetts, U.S.
- Died: December 18, 1989 (aged 84) Lakeville, Massachusetts, U.S.
- Education: Harvard College; Harvard Law School

William Gurdon Saltonstall (November 11, 1905 – December 18, 1989) was an American educator and writer, and the ninth principal of Phillips Exeter Academy.

== Early life ==
Saltonstall was born in Milton, Massachusetts to the wealthy Saltonstall family. He was a son of Robert Saltonstall and Caroline James (née Stevenson) Saltonstall. Among his siblings was Harriet Saltonstall Gratwick, a co-founder of the Rochester Zen Center.

His paternal grandparents were William Gurdon Saltonstall and Josephine Rose (née Lee) Saltonstall (youngest daughter of John Clarke Lee, founder of Lee, Higginson & Co.). His maternal grandparents were Caroline James (née Young) Stevenson and Brig. Gen. Robert Hooper Stevenson (brother of Thomas G. Stevenson).

He was educated at Exeter, where he was a member of the class of 1924. He then attended Harvard College, where he was president of the student body and field marshal of the graduating class, and Harvard Law School, where he earned master's and law degrees and was a member of the Owl Club.

== Career ==
He served as the principal of Exeter from 1946 to 1963, where he had previously taught history. Under him, the Lamont Gallery, the schools educational art museum was established. In 1963, Saltonstall was asked by President Kennedy to be the director of the Peace Corps in Nigeria. After two years, he left.

He was a trustee of Colby College and University of Massachusetts Dartmouth, and a former member of the Harvard Board of Overseers and United States Naval Academy Board of Visitors. He was a trustee of Educational Testing Service, and a president of the New England Association of Schools and Colleges.

== Personal life ==
On September 22, 1931, Saltonstall was married to Katharyn Saltonstall with whom he had three daughters and two sons:

- Josephine Saltonstall, who married Courtland Butler Converse in 1953. She later married Hetzeck.
- Katharyn Saltonstall, who married Dr. Roland Hok in 1961.
- Deborah Saltonstall, who married Peter Pratt Twining in 1968.
- William Gurdon Saltonstall.
- Samuel Saltonstall.

Saltonstall died on December 18, 1989, at a nursing home in Lakeville, Massachusetts.

=== Honors and legacy ===
He held honorary degrees from several schools, including Williams College, Tufts University, Bowdoin College, Dartmouth College, Colby College, Princeton University, and University of New Hampshire. The Saltonstall Boathouse in Phillips Exeter is named after him.

== Published works ==
- John Phillips, 1719-1795: merchant, shipowner, landed proprietor, and founder of Phillips Exeter Academy. (1951)
- Lewis Perry of Exeter: A Gentle Memoir. (1980)
- Ports of Piscataqua: Soundings in the Maritime History of the Portsmouth, N.H., Customs District from the Days of Queen Elizabeth and the Planting of Strawberry Banke to the Times of Abraham Lincoln and the Waning of the American Clipper. (1941)
