= Radical Abolitionism =

1973 book

- Author: Lewis Perry
- Subject: Abolitionism in the United States
- Publisher: Cornell University Press
- Publication date: 1973
- Pages: 328

Radical Abolitionism: Anarchy and the Government of God in Antislavery Thought is a 1973 book by Lewis Perry on radicals in the abolitionist movement in the United States.

== Bibliography ==
- Curry, Richard O. (1973). Perry, Lewis (ed.). "Romantic Radicalism in Antebellum America". Reviews in American History. 1 (4): 524–530. doi:10.2307/2701717. ISSN 0048-7511. JSTOR 2701717.
- Eminhizer, Earl Eugene (1973). "Review of Radical Abolitionism: Anarchy and the Government of God in Antislavery Thought". Church History. 42 (4): 569. doi:10.2307/3164992. ISSN 0009-6407. JSTOR 3164992. S2CID 161770827.
- Kraditor, Aileen S. (1973). "Review of Radical Abolitionism: Anarchy and the Government of God in Antislavery Thought". The Journal of Southern History. 39 (4): 596–598. doi:10.2307/2205980. ISSN 0022-4642. JSTOR 2205980.
- Lander, Ernest M. (1973). "Review of Stephen A. Douglas; Radical Abolitionism: Anarchy and the Government of God in Antislavery Thought". The Annals of the American Academy of Political and Social Science. 409: 204–206. doi:10.1177/000271627340900150. ISSN 0002-7162. JSTOR 1041534. S2CID 144060750.
- Macleod, Duncan J. (1974). "Review of Radical Abolitionism: Anarchy and the Government of God in Antislavery Thought". The American Historical Review. 79 (2): 580. doi:10.1086/ahr/79.2.580. ISSN 0002-8762. JSTOR 1850444.
- Persons, Stow (1974). "Review of Radical Abolitionism: Anarchy and the Government of God in Antislavery Thought". The Journal of American History. 60 (4): 1117–1118. doi:10.2307/1901050. ISSN 0021-8723. JSTOR 1901050.
- Scroggs, Jack B. (1974). "Review of Radical Abolitionism: Anarchy and the Government of God in Antislavery Thought". The Historian. 36 (2): 340–341. ISSN 0018-2370. JSTOR 24443722.
- Sorin, Gerald (1974). "Review of Radical Abolitionism: Anarchy and the Government of God in Antislavery Thought". New York History. 55 (3): 354–356. ISSN 0146-437X. JSTOR 23169695.
