= Walter Quincy Scott =

American educator (1845–1917)

2nd President of Ohio State University
- In office Jun 21, 1881 – June 20, 1883
- Preceded by: Edward Orton Sr.
- Succeeded by: William Henry Scott

5th Principal of Phillips Exeter Academy
- In office 1884–1889
- Preceded by: Albert Cornelius Perkins
- Succeeded by: Charles Everett Fish

Personal details
- Born: December 19, 1845 Dayton, Ohio, U.S.
- Died: May 9, 1917 (aged 71) Ellensburg, Washington, U.S.

Walter Quincy Scott (December 19, 1845 – May 9, 1917) was an American educator who was the second President of Ohio State University and the fifth principal of Phillips Exeter Academy.

Scott was born in Dayton, Ohio on December 19, 1845, to Abram McLean Scott and Julia Ann Scott. At a young age, he moved to Iowa. He attended Fairfield University, his studies punctuated with the start of the American Civil War. After serving in the Civil War, Scott attended Lafayette College in Easton, Pennsylvania and the Columbia University-affiliated Union Theological Seminary. Immediately after graduating, he began teaching ancient languages at Lafayette. An ordained Presbyterian minister, Scott led Arch Street Presbyterian Church in Philadelphia, Pennsylvania from 1874 to 1878. He started teaching at Wooster College in 1878, where he was professor of mental and moral philosophy and political economy. In 1881, he became president of Ohio State University. Though he was popular with students, he was immensely disliked by politicians, and resigned in 1883 due to frequent interference in his work from politicians. The following year, he became principal of Phillips Exeter Academy. He resigned in 1889 to go to Chicago, Illinois, and enter the publishing business. Disliking the city, he soon became the pastor of a Presbyterian church in Albany, New York. He resigned after three years. In 1909, he was named President Emeritus of the Ohio State University Board of Trustees. In his later years he served at the Bible Teachers' Training School of New York City as a professor of church history and ethnic religions.

Walter Scott died on May 9, 1917, in Ellensburg, Washington. He was married to Cornelia (Edgar) Scott, with whom he had three children: Walter Quincy Scott Jr., Edith Davis, and Cornelia Bull.

Academic offices
Preceded by Edward Orton Sr.	Ohio State University President; June 21, 1881 – June 20, 1883	Succeeded by William Henry Scott
Preceded by Albert Perkins	Principal of Phillips Exeter Academy; 1884–1889	Succeeded by Charles Fish
