= Benjamin Abbot =

American schoolteacher

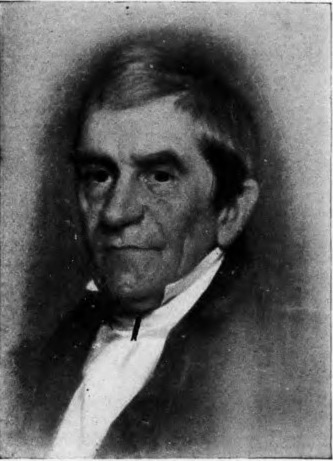
- portrait by Chester Harding

2nd Principal of Phillips Exeter Academy
- In office 1788–1838
- Preceded by: William Woodbridge
- Succeeded by: Gideon Lane Soule

Personal details
- Born: September 17, 1762 Andover, Massachusetts, British America
- Died: October 25, 1849 (aged 87) Exeter, New Hampshire, U.S.
- Education: Harvard University; Dartmouth College

Benjamin Abbot (September 17, 1762 – October 25, 1849) was an American schoolteacher. He is known for his work as a teacher and the second principal at Phillips Exeter Academy.

He was born in Andover, Massachusetts, the son of John Abbot from a family settled in Andover since its earliest days. He entered Phillips Academy, Andover in 1782, then entered Harvard University, graduating in 1788. He married his first wife, Hannah Tracy Emery, in 1791. Later, in 1798, he married again, to Mary Perkins. He had four children.

In 1811, he received a LLD degree from Dartmouth College. He was a teacher and the principal of the Phillips Exeter Academy, teaching such subjects as Latin, Greek, and mathematics.

His students included such prominent individuals as Lewis Cass, Daniel Webster, Edward Everett, Jared Sparks, and Francis Bowen. Daniel Webster paid tribute to him at his retirement. In 1815, Abbot was elected a member of the American Antiquarian Society

He died in Exeter, New Hampshire in 1849, aged 87. Abbot Hall, the oldest dormitory at Phillips Exeter Academy, is named for Benjamin Abbot.
