= Harlan Amen =

Principal of Phillips Exeter Academy

Harlan P. Amen

7th Principal of Phillips Exeter Academy
- In office 1895–1913
- Preceded by: Charles Everett Fish
- Succeeded by: Lewis Perry

Personal details
- Born: April 14, 1853 Sinking Spring, Ohio, U.S.
- Died: November 9, 1913 (aged 60) Exeter, New Hampshire, U.S.
- Education: Harvard University

Harlan Page Amen (/ˈeɪmən/; April 14, 1853 – November 9, 1913) was an American educator and the seventh principal of Phillips Exeter Academy.

== Biography ==
Harlan Amen was born in Sinking Spring, Ohio, in April 1853, to Daniel and Sarah J. (Barber) Amen. He was born into a poor family, and had to make an earning working as a clerk at a bookstore. He attended high school in Portsmouth, Ohio, then attended Exeter, where he befriended his roommate and future president of Bowdoin College, William De Witt Hyde, entering in 1871. He sustained himself during his education by working as a tutor, among other jobs. In his senior year, he was awarded the $120 Gordon scholarship. He then went on to Harvard University, graduating in 1879. Immediately after graduating, he began work at Riverview Military Academy in Poughkeepsie, New York, where he became principal. He took a four month leave in 1892 to visit prestigious public schools in England, including Eton, Harrow, Rugby, and St Paul's. In 1895, he became the principal of Exeter.

Under Amen's leadership, the size of student body, the faculty body, and the enrollment tripled. Dormitories Soule Hall, Peabody Hall, Hoyt Hall and Webster Hall were built. Alumni Hall, the first dedicated dining hall, was built in 1903 and has since been renovated to house the Mayer Art Center and the Lamont Gallery. The library, previously housed in the Academy Building, was moved to the Davis Library, funds for which were willed by Benjamin Price Davis '62 in 1907. During his time at Exeter, he was also involved in the founding of Fessenden School, encouraging the founder, Frederick Fessenden, to purchase the plot of land on which the school sits. While at Exeter, Amen was also known as a staunch advocate for football as the Academy was a leader in helping with the foundation of the sport in America. He notably wrote a public letter in which he challenged Harvard president, Charles William Eliot, by emphasizing the importance of football. Amen declared, "Mental and physical alertness, discipline, self-reliance, self-control, the power of unified action can hardly be better taught than through the game of football." He remained principal until his death in November 1913.

Amen was married to Mary Brown Rawson on April 5, 1882, with whom he had one son, John Harlen Amen, a lawyer and the Nuremberg Prison Chief interrogator, and three daughters: Margaret R., Elizabeth W. and R. Perne Amen. He was awarded an honorary Master of Arts degree by Williams College in 1886, and a Doctor of Letters degree by Dartmouth College in 1911. He died on November 9, 1913, in Exeter, and was a Presbyterian. Amen Hall at Exeter is named for him.
