= John Amen =

US Army lawyer at the Nuremberg trials

John Harlan Amen
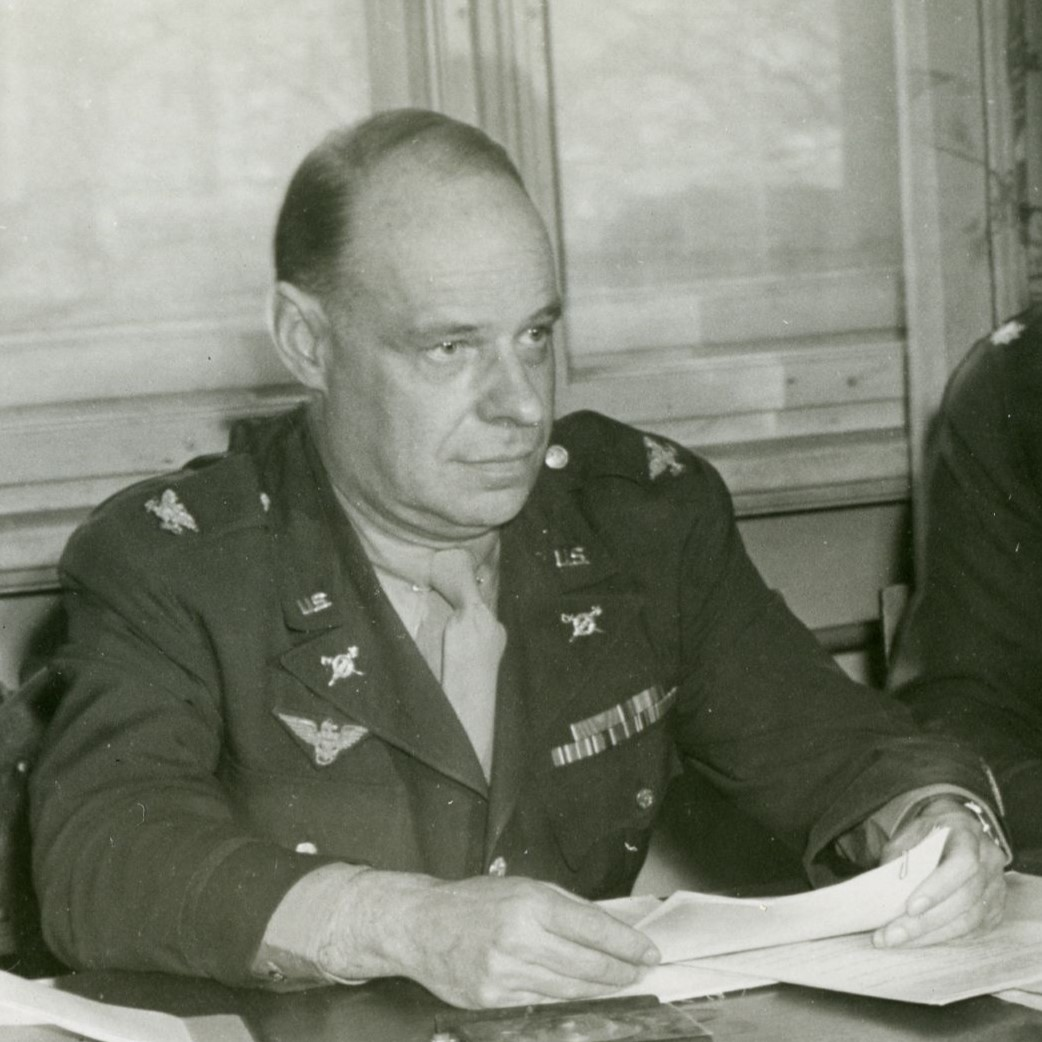
- John Amen was an Army Intelligence officer; prosecutor and head of the Interrogation Division, Nuremberg trials.
- Born: September 15, 1898; Exeter, New Hampshire
- Died: March 10, 1960 (aged 61)
- Spouse: Marion Cleveland Dell
- Relatives: Grover Cleveland (father-in-law)
- Military career
- Allegiance: United States
- Branch: United States Army
- Rank: Colonel
- Conflicts: World War II
- Awards: Legion of Merit (2); Commander of the Royal Norwegian Order of Saint Olav; Order of the White Lion (Czechoslovakia)
- Other work: Lawyer

John Harlan Amen (September 15, 1898 – March 10, 1960) was a lawyer and United States Army Intelligence officer, who served as Nuremberg Prison Chief Interrogator during the Nuremberg War Crimes Trials.

== Early life and education ==
John Harlan Amen was born on September 15, 1898, to Harlan Page Amen and Mary Rawson in Exeter, New Hampshire. He graduated from Phillips Exeter Academy in 1915, where his father had previously been appointed as a principal, and from Princeton University in 1919. He attended Harvard Law School from 1919 to 1923.

== Legal and political career ==
He was admitted to the New York bar in 1923. He served as an associate with Shearman & Sterling in New York from 1923 to 1928.

From 1928 to 1938, he was a partner in the firm of Duryee, Zunino, & Amen. In 1938, he was a partner in the firm Parker & Duryee.

He served as a special assistant to the United States Attorney General on cases involving anti-trust laws from 1928 to 1938.

On October 26, 1938, he was appointed as the special prosecutor to supersede the district attorney of Kings County in connection with investigation of official corruption in Brooklyn.

Amen served on the prosecution for the Murder Inc. killers. His investigation eventually led to the dismissal of nearly a dozen police officers for accepting fraudulent bonds.

== Military career ==
He served as a 2nd lieutenant in the United States Marine Corps Reserve Flying Corps in World War I.

By 1942, he was a lieutenant colonel with the United States Army. He was promoted to colonel in 1944.

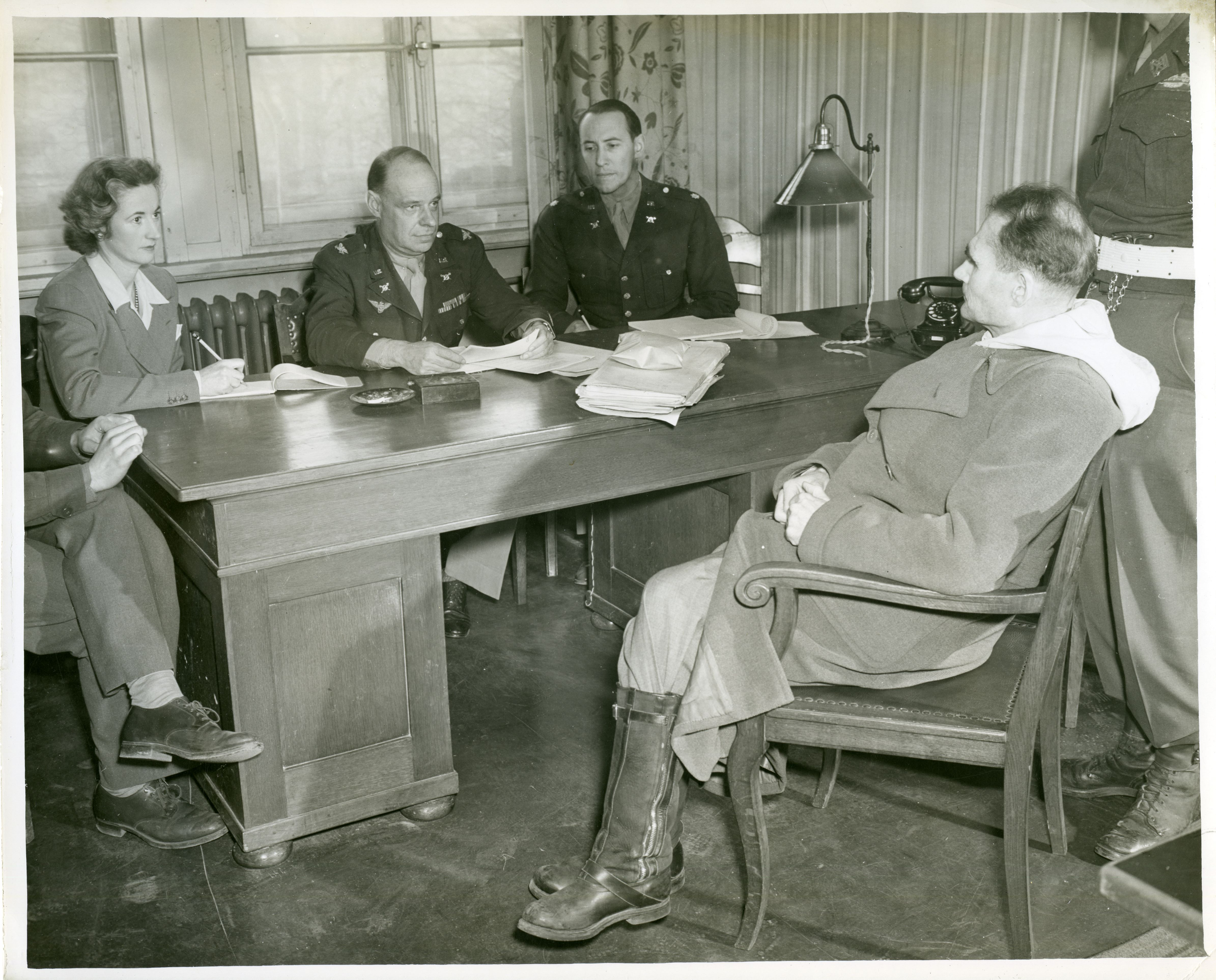
Rudolph Hess being interrogated by Col. John Amen and Col. Smith Brookhart, October 1945

During the Nuremberg trials, he served as the Associate trial counsel, chief interrogations division office for the United States Chief of Counsel in war criminal trials at Nuremberg from 1945 to 1946.

== Personal life and death ==
Amen married Marion Cleveland Dell, the daughter of former President Grover Cleveland, on July 25, 1926. John and Marion Amen had one son, Grover Cleveland. Amen died on March 10, 1960.

== Awards and honors ==
Amen received the Legion of Merit with Oak Leaf Cluster, the Order of St. Olav with rank of Commander from Norway, and the Order of the White Lion from Czechoslovakia.

== Portrayals ==
John Amen has been portrayed by the following actors in film, television and theater productions:

- David McIlwraith (2000) Nuremberg (Canadian/American television production)
- Michael Fitzpatrick (2006) Nuremberg: Goering's Last Stand (British television production)
- Tim Woodward (2006) Nuremberg: Nazis on Trial (BBC television docudrama)
- Mark O'Brien (2025) Nuremberg (film)
