= William Ernest Gillespie =

Interim Principal of Phillips Exeter Academy
- In office 1963–1964
- Preceded by: William Gurdon Saltonstall
- Succeeded by: Richard Ward Day

Personal details
- Born: February 9, 1912 Exeter, New Hampshire
- Died: November 5, 1967 (aged 55) Exeter, New Hampshire
- Education: Phillips Exeter Academy; Princeton University

William Ernest Gillespie (February 9, 1912 – November 5, 1967) was an American educator who served as assistant principal, dean of faculty, and interim principal at Phillips Exeter Academy.

== Early life and career ==
Gillespie was born on February 9, 1912, in Exeter, New Hampshire, to Walter and Margaret (Alexander) Gillespie. His father taught Latin at Phillips Exeter from 1910 to 1940. He was educated at local public schools, and graduated from Phillips Exeter in 1929. He went on to study at Princeton University, where he graduated in 1933, and earned his MA and PhD degrees in classics in 1935 and 1937, respectively. Beginning his career in teaching Latin at Exeter in September 1939, he was only absent from the school for three years when he served in the U.S. Navy during World War II. He was appointed assistant to the principal in 1960, taking charge of a variety of administrative matters for principal William Saltonstall; upon the latter's resignation in June 1963 to join the Peace Corps, he was named acting principal for one year, until the appointment of Richard W. Day. Under Day's leadership, Gillespie served as assistant principal and dean of the faculty.

== Acting Principal of Phillips Exeter Academy, 1963-1964 ==
As acting principal, Gillespie introduced numerous long-lasting changes to Academy regulations and policy, most notably regarding smoking and drug abuse. For example, recognizing the growing evidence of the harmful effects of smoking, Gillespie himself quit smoking and introduced more stringent restrictions on smoking by students. In 1964, Gillespie permitted the secretary of the Communist Party to speak in the Academy assembly hall, but then denied the same privilege to Richard Alpert and Timothy Leary, who both had been suspended from the Harvard University faculty. Exeter students criticized Gillespie for this apparent inconsistency regarding freedom of speech, but he regained their support after presenting his case in a forthright address to students in chapel by pointing out the difference between the dangers of Communism and of hallucinogenic drugs.

== "Warm Nest" Comment, 1964 ==
In Gillespie's last public speech to the Academy, an address to the seniors at the commencement of 1964, his closing words aroused no little misinterpretation and controversy.

It is nearly time for you to be off. You have a lot to do. This is no time to concern ourselves with nostalgia. As a matter of fact, I don't think anybody has ever claimed that Exeter is a warm nest. But I hope, and I expect, that when you find yourselves involved in skirmishes on the frontiers of barbarism, which are not very far away, you'll strike some shrewd blows in favor of civilization. Some day you'll come back to show us your trophies and your scars, and we'll be glad to see you.

Coming at a time of societal discontent and upheaval in America, Gillespie's words were widely misinterpreted and misquoted. "Exeter is not a warm nest" became a rallying cry among advocates for reform, specifically with regard to what was then perceived as a harsh advising and disciplinary system.

Gillespie died on November 5, 1967, in Exeter Hospital. He was married to Janet Lansing Wicks, with whom he had four children, two sons and two daughters.
