= William Woodbridge (educator) =

American educator (1755–1836)

1st Preceptor of Phillips Exeter Academy
- In office 1783–1788
- Preceded by: Position created
- Succeeded by: Benjamin Abbot

Personal details
- Born: September 14, 1755 Glastonbury, Connecticut, British America
- Died: March 27, 1836 (aged 80) Franklin, Connecticut, U.S.
- Education: Yale University

William Woodbridge (September 14, 1755 – March 27, 1836) was an American educator and the first preceptor of Phillips Exeter Academy. He was especially interested in female education.

William Woodbridge was born in Glastonbury, Connecticut, to British immigrants on September 14, 1755. He worked on his father's farm until he resolved to join the ministry at the age of 21, and entering school which he paid for by working and teaching in his spare time. During his senior year in college, he taught a young ladies school for three months in New Haven County, Connecticut. After graduating from Yale College in 1780, he went on to make a living as a teacher, though he was also qualified to be a minister. In 1783, he was chosen to be the first preceptor of the newly created Phillips Exeter Academy. In 1789 he opened and became principal of a female academy in Medford, Massachusetts, which was the first Female Seminary in New England, where he worked for seven years. In 1799 he was president of an association for the improvement of common schools in Middletown, Connecticut. In November 1835, he took charge of a school for girls in Franklin, Connecticut.

Over his lifetime, he authored textbooks on grammar and writing, and following his time at Exeter, contributed to the Annals of Education, a journal owned by his son. He also contributed to the Juvenile Rambler, a children's paper published in Boston, and wrote a book for children entitled The Dead Bird.

He married first in 1785 to Elizabeth Brooks of Exeter, N.H., with whom he had twin daughters Elizabeth and Mary. Elizabeth died at age 27 in November 1787. He then married Ann Channing with whom he had a son, William Channing Woodbridge, a geographer, educational reformer, and textbook author. He then married Sarah Stiles, and finally Abigail (Wolcott) Butler. He died February 27, 1836, in Franklin, Connecticut, of apoplexy.
