= List of Phillips Exeter Academy principals =

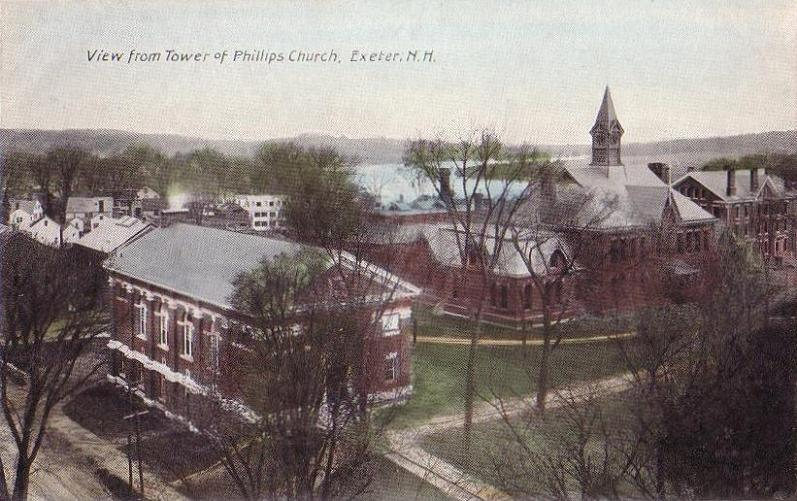
A view of Phillips Exeter Academy from Phillips Church in 1911

The following is a list of principals of Phillips Exeter Academy, an independent preparatory school in Exeter, New Hampshire, founded in 1781 by John Phillips. There have, since 1783, been 16 principals in total, including one interim principal. From the founding of the academy to 1808, the head of school was called preceptor before it was changed to principal.

== Principals ==
Image	Principal	Served
–	William Woodbridge	1783–1788
	Benjamin Abbot	1788–1838
	Gideon Lane Soule	1838–1873
	Albert Cornelius Perkins	1873–1883
	Walter Quincy Scott	1884–1889
–	Charles Everett Fish	1890–1895
	Harlan Page Amen	1895–1913
	Lewis Perry	1914–1946
–	William Gurdon Saltonstall	1946–1963
–	William Ernest Gillespie (interim)	1963–1964
–	Richard Ward Day	1964–1973
	Stephen Guild Kurtz	1974–1987
–	Kendra Stearns O'Donnell	1987–1997
–	Tyler Chapman Tingley	1997–2009
–	Thomas Edward Hassan	2009–2015
–	Lisa MacFarlane	2015–2018
–	William Knox Rawson	2019–2026
–	Jennifer Karlen Elliott	2026- present
