= Richard W. Day =

Richard Ward Day

10th Principal of Phillips Exeter Academy
- In office 1964–1973
- Preceded by: William Gurdon Saltonstall; W. Ernest Gillespie (interim)
- Succeeded by: Stephen Guild Kurtz

Personal details
- Born: August 14, 1916 Boston, Massachusetts, U.S.
- Died: July 3, 1978 (aged 61) Montclair, New Jersey, U.S.
- Resting place: Mayflower Cemetery; Duxbury, Massachusetts, U.S.
- Education: Yale University; Harvard University

Military service
- Allegiance: United States
- Branch/service: 101st Airborne Division
- Years of service: 1942–1945
- Rank: Major
- Battles/wars: World War II, Pacific Theater

Richard Ward Day (August 14, 1916 – July 3, 1978) was an American educator and the 10th principal of Phillips Exeter Academy.

Richard W. Day was born in Boston, Massachusetts on August 14, 1916, to Hilbert Francis Day and Elizabeth V. H. Richards. He attended Shady Hill School in Cambridge, Massachusetts, and Belmont Hill School in Belmont, Massachusetts, and was educated at Yale University, where he graduated in 1938. During World War II, Day was inducted into the U.S. Army in March 1942 and was commissioned in November; he served for a time in the S2 section of the 515th Parachute Infantry Regiment and was assigned as an aide-de-camp to General Gaither in December 1943. He was promoted to major and served with 101st Airborne Division in the Pacific theater as a paratrooper. After the war, he attended Harvard University, where he earned his doctorate in history in 1950. From 1964 to 1973, he served as the principal at Exeter. He was appointed in 1963; however, due to other commitments he was unable to assume his position until the following year. William Earnest Gillespie instead served as interim principal. Under him, the Class of 1945 Library, designed by Louis Kahn, was commissioned and built. The academy also became coeducational under Day in 1970. Following his time at Exeter, he served as the principal of Montclair Kimberley Academy. Across his life, he taught at several institutions, including Germantown Academy, Choate Rosemary Hall, and St. Paul's School in New Hampshire. He was also a trustee of the College Entrance Examination Board, Saddle River Country Day School and Mount Saint Dominic Academy.

He was married to Katharine MacAusland, with whom he had a daughter, Lydia Day Hart, and two sons, Richard W. Day Jr. and Andrew M. Day. He died on July 3, 1978, at the age of 61, in Montclair, New Jersey, and was buried in Mayflower Cemetery in Duxbury, Massachusetts.

== Published works ==
- Day, Richard W. (1950). A New England Schoolmaster: The Life of Henry Franklin Cutler. Hildreth Press. pp. 274. "A New England Schoolmaster: The Life of Henry Franklin Cutler."
