= Arthur Latham Perry =

American economist (1830–1905)

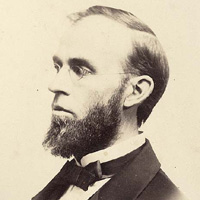
- Arthur Latham Perry, circa 1866
- Born: February 27, 1830; Lyme, New Hampshire, United States
- Died: July 9, 1905 (aged 75); Williamstown, Massachusetts

Academic background
- Education: Williams College

Academic work
- Discipline: Macroeconomics
- Institutions: Williams College

Arthur Latham Perry (February 27, 1830 – July 9, 1905), born in Lyme, New Hampshire, was a prominent American economist and advocate of free trade. He graduated from Williams College in 1852 and was Orrin Sage Professor of history and political economy there from 1853 to 1891, when he became professor emeritus.

His book Political Economy (1865) went through 22 editions during his life, and his Introduction to Political Economy (1877) went through five editions. His final statement came in 1891 with his Principles of Political Economy.

== Free trade philosophy ==
For several years he toured the country during his summer holidays, giving lectures on the principle of free trade for The American Free Trade League. In 1868–69, he publicly debated this question with Horace Greeley in Boston and New York.

His basic case against protectionism was that it benefited the rich at the expense of the poor, the industrialists at the expense of farmers and others, as is indicated in the title of his widely circulated pamphlet, "Foes of the Farmers" (1874).

== Other works ==
He was also a local historian, and wrote extensively on this topic. His best-known works were two, massive histories of the town he lived in:

- Origins in Williamstown, published in 1894.
- Williamstown and Williams college, published in 1899.

He also wrote a genealogy of his Perry family.

== Legacy ==
Though he was the "most widely read American economist of his time", with his texts taking only third place in sales behind those of Adam Smith and J.S. Mill, his name does not appear in most histories of economics, such as that of Joseph Schumpeter. The reason for this later neglect may lie in the general decreased reputation for the scholarship of the French Liberal School of Frédéric Bastiat, the general approach of which Perry carried on. Perry conceived of economics as the "science of Buying and Selling," or, as Richard Whately earlier termed it, catallactics.

== Personal life ==
He married Mary Brown Smedley, with whom he had five sons, Bliss, Arthur, Walter, Carroll, and Lewis, and a daughter, Grace.
