= Lamont Gallery =

- Established: May 30, 1953
- Location: Frederick R. Mayer Art Center, Phillips Exeter Academy, Exeter, New Hampshire, United States
- Coordinates: 42°58′48.721″N 70°57′7.351″W
- Type: Art gallery
- Key holdings: Irene Estrella
- Visitors: 7,272 (2015–2016)
- Owner: Phillips Exeter Academy
- Parking: Surrounding streets
- Website: www.exeter.edu/arts-exeter/lamont-gallery

The Lamont Gallery is a non-profit art gallery located on the campus of Phillips Exeter Academy, in Exeter, New Hampshire, United States. It primarily showcases visiting exhibitions of local, national and international acclaimed artists, along with art of Phillips Exeter students and faculty. However, it also possesses a small collection.

== History ==
The museum was commissioned in 1951 and began construction in June 1952. The gallery was given to the school by the Lamont family, which includes academy alumni such as Thomas W. Lamont, Corliss Lamont, and Ned Lamont, as well as by alumni Harvey Kent and Earl F. Slick, the founder of Slick Airways. The cost of the establishment paid through donations was valued at $150,000. The Davison Construction Company was contracted to build the gallery, which was an extension on the Mayer Art Center building, then named Alumni Hall. It was named in honor of Thomas William Lamont II, class of 1942, who died aboard the USS Snook in World War II when it went missing on April 8, 1945, and was dedicated as a part of Alumni Day celebrations on May 30, 1953. The first director of the gallery was Glen Krause. Cabot Lyford, a prominent sculptor, served as the director of the gallery while leading the art department of Exeter. The gallery is in part, supported by the Michael C. Rockefeller ’56 Visiting Artists Fund.

== Collection ==
The Lamont Gallery's most famous painting in its possession is Irene Estrella, by Diego Rivera, which was donated to the gallery by Exeter alumnus Corliss Lamont in 1954. It was donated to the academy by Corliss Lamont, and has been shown at museums such as the Museum of Fine Arts in Boston, the Doge's Palace in Venice, and the Musée d'Orsay in Paris. Its collection also includes several more paintings by Rivera including a portrait of Lamont, various works by John James Audubon, George Inness, Yousuf Karsh, Maud Morgan, and Kiyoshi Saitō, as well four metal sculptures by Gerald Laing and two additional sculptures by Anthony Caro and Tony Smith, which are on display around the school campus. The gallery also possesses numerous artifacts dating to as far as the Han dynasty, which have been donated to the gallery by Phillips Exeter alumni.

== Visiting exhibitions ==
The Lamont Gallery frequently showcases the works of visiting artists and Exeter students and faculty. Recent exhibitions include "Neighboring", which showed the work of residents of Rockingham County; "2016, A State of Mind Boston Printmakers Members Show", which featured the works of members of the Boston Printmakers; and "Self Made", which displayed works exploring identity. The photographs of Elizabeth Gill Lui, an academy parent, have been displayed in "Open Hearts Open Doors", and the photographs of Steve Schapiro have been displayed in "Heroes". Visiting speakers have included photographer Matt Black. Art on display has been loaned from the New York Metropolitan Museum of Art.

== See also ==
- Glen Krause 1914-1981, by Glen Krause (1983)
