= Elizabeth Gill Lui =

American photographer and artist

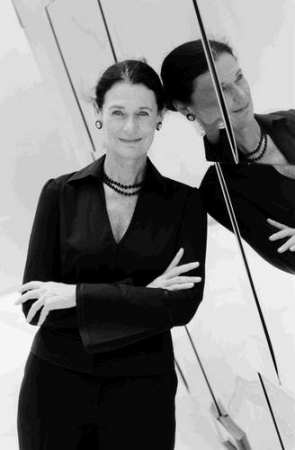
- Elizabeth Gill Lui
- Born: Nancy Elizabeth Gill; February 6, 1951 (age 75); Yonkers, New York, United States
- Known for: Photography, collage, glass, lithography
- Awards: Grants from The Ford Foundation; The Graham Foundation; The Rockefeller Brothers Fund; The Asian Cultural Council
- Website: www.elizabethlui.com

Elizabeth Gill Lui (born Nancy Elizabeth Gill; February 6, 1951) in Yonkers, New York is an American photographer and artist.

== Early life and education ==
Elizabeth Gill Lui, daughter to U.S. Air Force Colonel Richard M.Gill and Shirley Squire, spent her early childhood migrating with her father's military assignments in the Air Force Weather Service from Alaska to Wiesbaden, (Germany); Washington, D.C. to Alabama, and by middle school, Colorado Springs, Colorado. She attended Marymount International School London, a Catholic girls' boarding school, in the fifth and sixth grades; Cheyenne Mountain High School in Colorado Springs; graduated Phi Beta Kappa from Colorado College with a degree in comparative religion; pursued American Indian Studies at University of Denver; and studied architectural photography at Harvard Graduate School of Design in a program headed by Ezra Stoller.

As a fine arts minor at Colorado College, Gill Lui was creating detailed and graphic lithography and engraving, but by her late 20s, she began exploring photography in printmaking. After a car accident in 1979, she dedicated herself to her creative work, studying at a graduate level in architectural photography at Harvard. She recalls taking her first architectural photograph at age 10: Tudor architecture of the boarding school she attended in London.

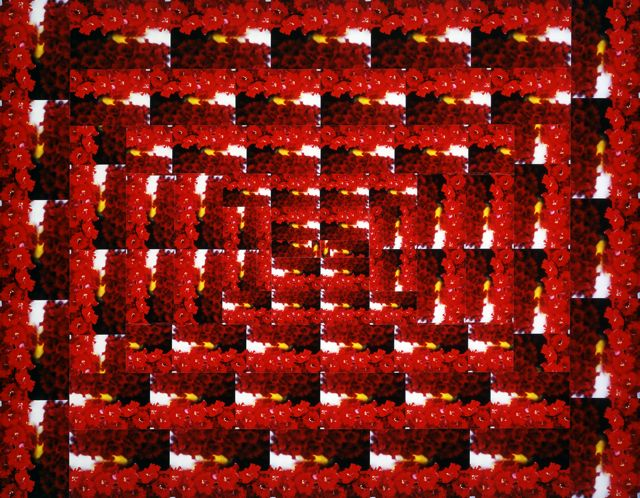
MANDALA 1 Snap Dragon Mandala from The Horizon Within; original photo collage; by Elizabeth Gill Lui.

== Career ==
Elizabeth Gill Lui's photographic work has been widely published and exhibited in museums and galleries; she is a recipient of grants from the Ford Foundation, the Graham Foundation for Advanced Studies in the Fine Arts, and the Rockefeller Brothers Fund and Asian Cultural Council. Her work has been exhibited in solo shows from Europe to Latvia, Japan to Hong Kong and throughout the United States; including The Denver Art Museum, The Camera Obscura Gallery, The National Museum of Wildlife Art in Jackson Hole, Wyoming, The Museum of Outdoor Arts in Denver, Colorado and The National Building Museum in Washington, DC.

Gill Lui's conceptual work in abstract photographic collage investigates the bridge between human consciousness, spirituality and scientific theory in physics and fractal geometry. Bodies of her work spanning the 80's to 00's include a survey of the architectural aesthetic of twentieth-century museums entitled Closed Mondays (Nazraeli Press, 1999), a book on the United States Air Force Academy entitled Spirit and Flight, a photographic monograph documenting the architecture of American Embassies in 52 countries worldwide entitled Building Diplomacy (Cornell University Press 2005), and an extensive investigation of the relation between the spiritual and the scientific order of nature entitled The Horizon Within.

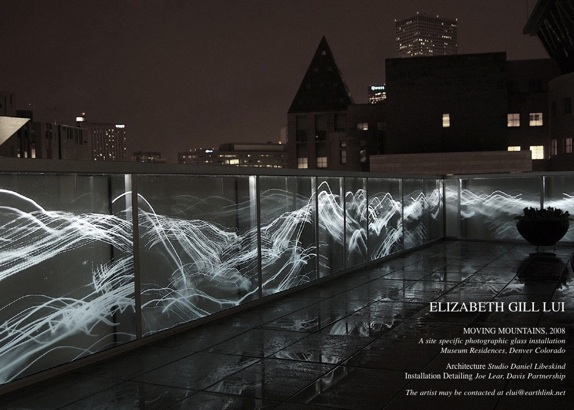
Moving Mountains 2008, at The Denver Art Museum Residences; original glass mural by Elizabeth Gill Lui. 125 linear feet.

Within the architectural and design community Gill Lui has also collaborated with a variety of clients, creating site specific installations of photographic glass projects; including in 2008, a LED lit glass-etched mural in conjunction with Daniel Libeskind studios at the Denver Art Museum complex.

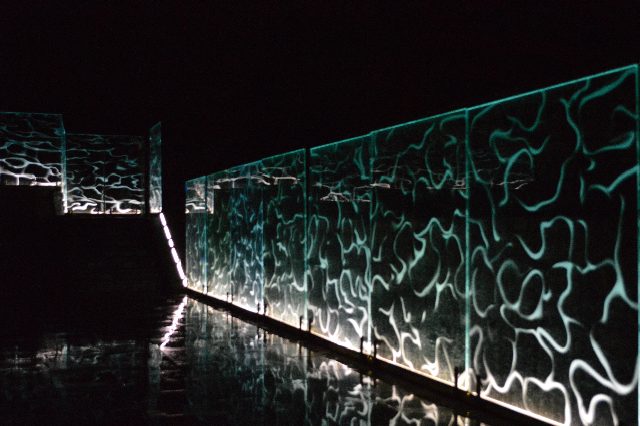
Liquid Light 2013. Private Residence Commission. Wickenburg, Arizona. Elizabeth Gill Lui. 200 linear feet.

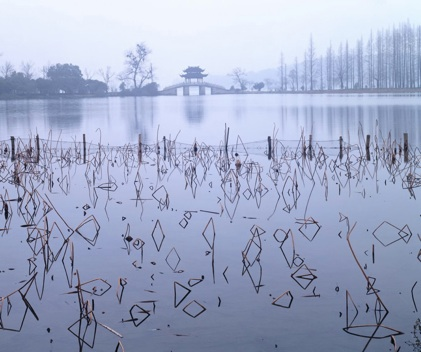
Cover image from Open Hearts Open Doors photograph by Elizabeth Gill Lui. Published by Four Stops Press and distributed by Cornell University Press.

In both the artist's architectural and conceptual work she seeks the philosophical and symbolic implications between man and his environment: a "visual philosopher".

To me, the ideas behind art are more important than the art object. The influence of philosophy on my work has been lifelong and profound. I am interested in the universal nature of spirituality in all cultures, such as the similarities between native American religion and Chinese religion, the connection these peoples have with the earth.

—Elizabeth Gill Lui

As a visiting artist in residence at Chinese University of Hong Kong from 1995 to 2006, Gill Lui documented Chinese vernacular architecture in rural Southeastern China. The resulting book Open Hearts Open Doors: Reflections of China's Past and Future (2008) published by Four Stops Press and distributed by Cornell University Press includes bi-lingual text by academics, architects, and historians, including Vincent Lo, Ho Puay Peng, Peter Wong and an epilogue by architect I.M. Pei.
