= Gideon Lane Soule =

American educator (1796–1879)

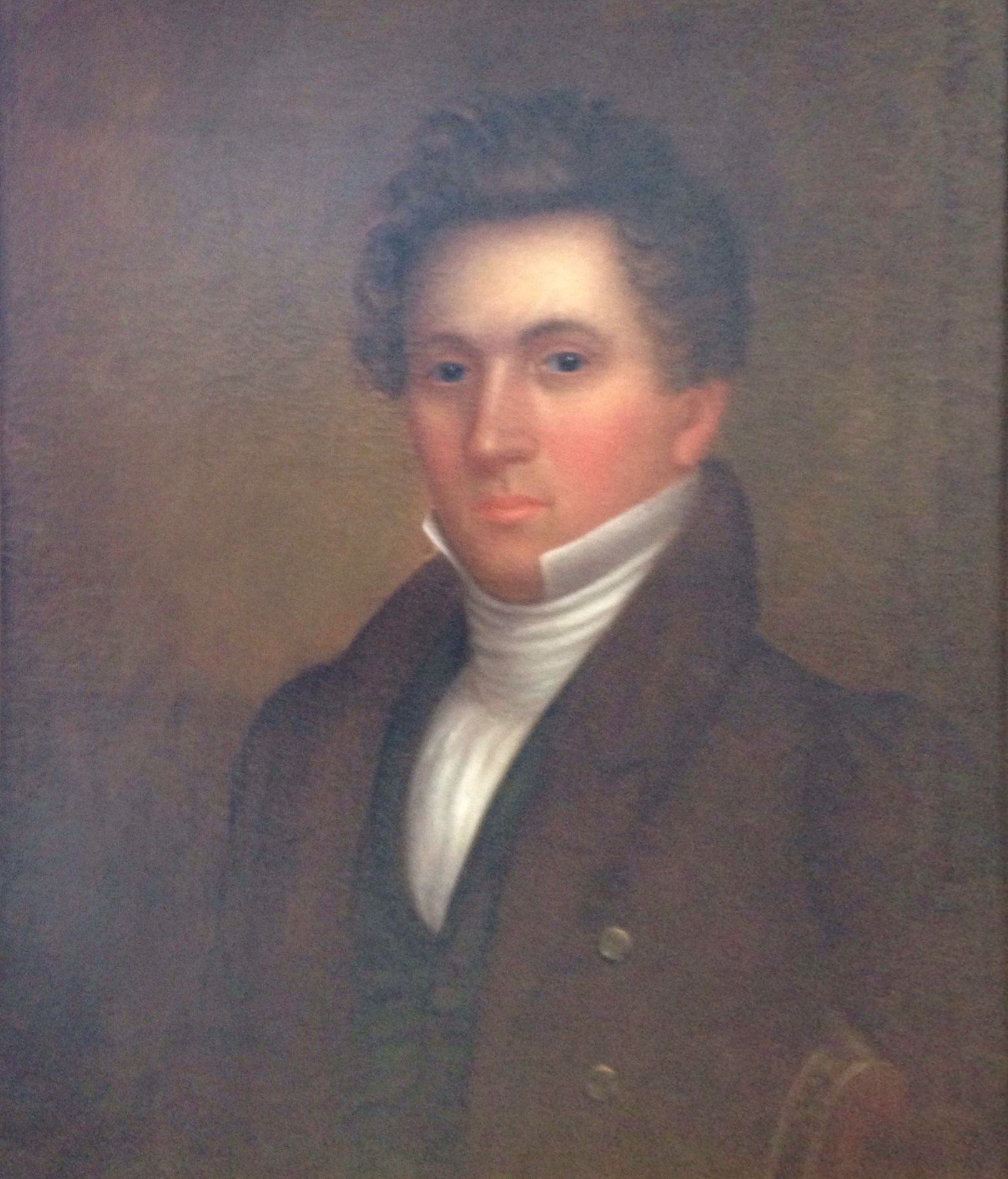

3rd Principal of Phillips Exeter Academy
- In office 1838–1873
- Preceded by: Benjamin Abbot
- Succeeded by: Albert Cornelius Perkins

Personal details
- Born: July 25, 1796 Freeport, Maine, U.S.
- Died: May 28, 1879 (aged 82) Exeter, New Hampshire, U.S.
- Spouse: Elizabeth Phillips Soule
- Education: Bowdoin College; Harvard University

Gideon Lane Soule (/soʊl/ SOHL; July 25, 1796 – May 28, 1879) was an American educator, and the third principal of Phillips Exeter Academy.

Soule was born in Freeport, Maine, in 1796 to Moses and Martha Soule. He was descended from George Soule, a Mayflower passenger, and John Wheelwright, the founder of the town of Exeter, New Hampshire. At a young age, he left school to work as an errand boy for Jacob Abbot, who helped him attain admission to Phillips Exeter in 1813. After three years, he entered Bowdoin College, graduating in 1818. He taught at Exeter for a year as an assistant teacher, then left. He returned in 1822, as a permanent instructor in classical language. In 1838, he replaced Benjamin Abbot as principal of Exeter. He resigned as principal in 1873 citing old age as his reason. In 1856, he was awarded an LL.D degree by Harvard University.

Augustus Lord Soule

He was married to Elizabeth P. Emery, with whom he had five children. His two daughters died in infancy, while his three sons, Charles Emery, Nicholas Emery, and Augustus Lord, lived into adulthood. Augustus Soule went on to become a New York Supreme Court Judge. Gideon Soule died in Exeter on May 28, 1879.

Soule Hall, one of the oldest dormitories on campus, is named for Gideon Lane Soule, as was the Gideon Lane Soule Literary Society, which merged with the Golden Branch Literary Society to form what is now the Daniel Webster Debate Society at Exeter.
