= Lewis Perry =

American educator

7th Principal of Phillips Exeter Academy
- In office 1914–1946
- Preceded by: Harlan Page Amen
- Succeeded by: William Gurdon Saltonstall

Personal details
- Born: January 3, 1877 Williamstown, Massachusetts, U.S.
- Died: January 27, 1970 (aged 93) Bryn Mawr, Pennsylvania, U.S.
- Education: Williams College; Princeton University

Lewis Perry (January 3, 1877 – January 27, 1970) was an American educator and the eighth principal of Phillips Exeter Academy.

== Biography ==
Lewis Perry was born in Williamstown, Massachusetts, on January 3, 1877, to Arthur Latham Perry, a prominent economist, and Mary Brown Perry. He attended Lawrenceville School as well as Phillips Academy for one year, then Williams College, where he graduated in 1898. In Williams, he was the national president of the Alpha Delta Phi fraternity, of which his father helped found the Williams branch. He was also the first student to be awarded the Rogerson Cup award, the "highest award for alumni service" at Williams. He then attended Princeton University, where he earned an M.A. and a L.H.D degree. From 1901 to 1914, he taught English at Williams. In 1914, he became principal of Exeter. It was under Perry in 1919 that the Exeter Summer program was created. It was also under him that philanthropist Edward Harkness donated to the school $5.8 million to create the Harkness table teaching method in 1930. He retired in 1946.

Over his lifetime, he was awarded honorary L.H.D. degrees by Dartmouth, Yale, Amherst, the University of New Hampshire, and Harvard.

== Family ==
Perry first married Margaret Hubbell, with whom he had a daughter and a son. He later married Hubbell's sister, Juliette Adams, whose two daughters from her first marriage, Juliette and Margaret, became his stepdaughters. He died on January 27, 1970, in Bryn Mawr, Pennsylvania. a

See also his brother Bliss Perry, who was a noted professor of literature at Harvard.
