= Phillips Exeter Academy =

School in Exeter, New Hampshire, US

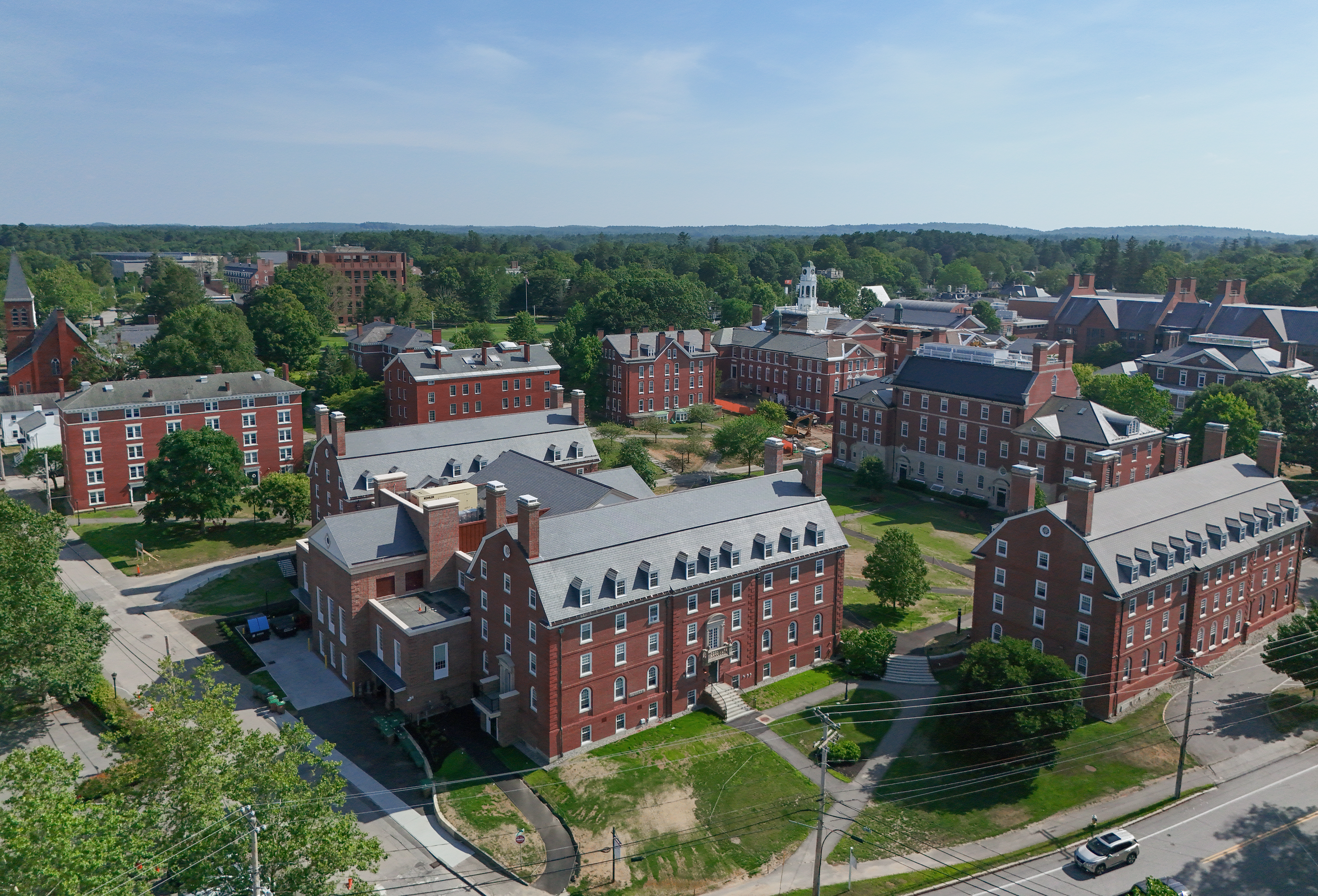
- Aerial view of Phillips Exeter Academy in 2025
- 20 Main Street; Exeter, New Hampshire 03833

Information
- Type: Independent; day; boarding; college preparatory
- Motto: Latin: Non Sibi ("not for oneself"); Latin: Finis Origine Pendet ("The End Depends Upon the Beginning"); Greek: Χάριτι Θεοῦ ("By the Grace of God")
- Religious affiliation: Nonsectarian
- Established: 1781; 245 years ago
- Founder: John Phillips; Elizabeth Phillips (Note: Elizabeth Phillips was recognized as co-founder of Phillips Exeter alongside her husband John in 2018.)
- CEEB code: 300185
- Principal: Jennifer Karlen Elliott
- Faculty: 217
- Grades: 9–12, PG
- Gender: Coeducational
- Enrollment: 1,078 (Note: 849 boarding 229 day)
- Average class size: 12 students
- Student to teacher ratio: 6:1
- Campus size: 700 acres (280 ha)
- Campus type: Suburban
- Colors: Lively maroon and grey
- Athletics: 22 Interscholastic sports; 62 Interscholastic teams
- Athletics conference: NEPSAC
- Team name: Big Red
- Rival: Phillips Academy (Andover)
- Accreditation: NAIS; TABS
- Newspaper: The Exonian
- Yearbook: Phillips Exeter Academy Notebook (PEAN)
- Endowment: $1.65 billion (February 2, 2026)
- School fees: Books & Supplies: $900
- Tuition: Boarding: $71,797; Day: $56,077
- Affiliations: Eight Schools Association; G30 Schools; Ten Schools Admission Organization
- Alumni: Exonians
- Website: exeter.edu

Phillips Exeter Academy (also known as Exeter or PEA) is an independent, co-educational, college-preparatory school in Exeter, New Hampshire. Established in 1781, it is America's sixth-oldest boarding school and educates an estimated 1,100 boarding and day students in grades 9 to 12, as well as postgraduate students.

Exeter houses the world's largest high school library. The academy admits students on a need-blind basis and offers free tuition to students with family incomes under $150,000. Its notable alumni include President Franklin Pierce, Senator Daniel Webster, over 35 U.S. congresspeople, six governors of U.S. states, Mark Zuckerberg, the founder of Facebook, businessman and philanthropist Tom Steyer, three Medal of Honor recipients, and three Nobel Prize recipients.

== History ==
=== Origins ===
Phillips Exeter Academy was established in 1781 by John and Elizabeth Phillips, citizens of Exeter, New Hampshire. It is the nation's sixth-oldest boarding school.

John Phillips had earned degrees from Harvard College and came to Exeter as a young man in 1741, initially as a teacher. He made his fortune as a merchant and banker, and gained influence over time as an advisor to the colonial governor, circuit court judge, elected representative, and senior militia officer in the years leading up to the American Revolutionary War. In 1778, he supported his nephew, Samuel Phillips Jr., financially when the latter founded Phillips Academy in Andover, Massachusetts, about 40 miles away. As result of this original family relationship, the two schools share a friendly and historic rivalry. John Phillips stipulated in Exeter's founding charter that it would "ever be equally open to youth of requisite qualifications from every quarter".

The new academy benefited from donors besides John Phillips. Phillips had previously been married to Sarah Gilman, the wealthy widow of Phillips' cousin, Nathaniel Gilman, whose large fortune, bequeathed to Phillips, enabled him to endow the academy. The Gilman family also donated to the academy much of the land on which it stands, including the initial 1793 grant by New Hampshire Governor John Taylor Gilman of the Yard, the oldest part of campus; the academy's first class in 1783 included seven Gilmans. In 1814, Nicholas Gilman, signer of the U.S. Constitution, left $1,000 to Exeter to teach sacred music.

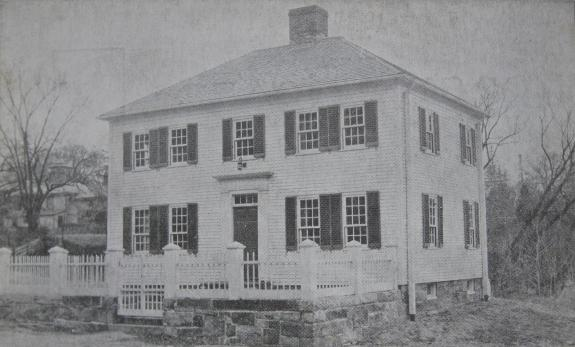
First Academy Building c. 1910, where the school opened in 1783

The academy's first schoolhouse, the First Academy Building, was built on a site on Tan Lane in 1783, and today stands not far from its original location. The building was dedicated on February 20, 1783, the same day that the school's first preceptor, William Woodbridge, was chosen by John Phillips.

Exeter's Deed of Gift, written by John Phillips at the founding of the school, states that Exeter's mission is to instill in its students both goodness and knowledge:

Above all, it is expected that the attention of instructors to the disposition of the minds and morals of the youth under their charge will exceed every other care; well considering that though goodness without knowledge is weak and feeble, yet knowledge without goodness is dangerous, and that both united form the noblest character, and lay the surest foundation of usefulness to mankind.

=== 19th century and rivalry with Phillips Academy ===
In the early 1800s, a deep religious divide opened up between Unitarian Harvard and Calvinist Yale. As a result, Unitarian-friendly Exeter developed a closer relationship with Harvard, and Calvinist-friendly Phillips Academy with Yale. Although originally, most Exeter graduates did not go on to further formal education (as with most 18th- and 19th-century secondary schools), the ones that did placed at Harvard in substantial numbers. From 1846 to 1870, Exeter supplanted Boston Latin School as Harvard's largest feeder school, supplying 16% of all Harvard students during that period. In the latter half of the 19th century, graduates of Exeter and the now-defunct Adams Academy of Quincy, Massachusetts, were "dominant socially" on Harvard Yard.

Exeter's first recorded minority student was Moses Uriah Hall, a young Black man, who entered the Academy in 1858, served in the Union Army during the Civil War, and was known for many years as a skilled stonemason and businessman in nearby Epping, New Hampshire. During the Civil War, four White students from a border state, Kentucky, threatened to leave the Academy unless it adopted a whites-only policy. The principal, Gideon Lane Soule, replied that "the colored student will stay, you can do as you please."

After a brief interlude in the 1880s when Exeter's focus partially shifted from college preparation to general education and only 18% of Exeter students went on to college, Charles Everett Fish (p. 1890–95) restored academic standards by adopting a policy of expelling students who could not attain a C average. A student in the Class of 1892 recalled that "[t]here was no real discipline ... the only measure of a boy's quality was his scholarship. If that was satisfactory, little else mattered." The percentages of students going on to college recovered rapidly to 1870s levels, although the student body shrank significantly, dropping from 355 in 1890 to 123 in 1895.

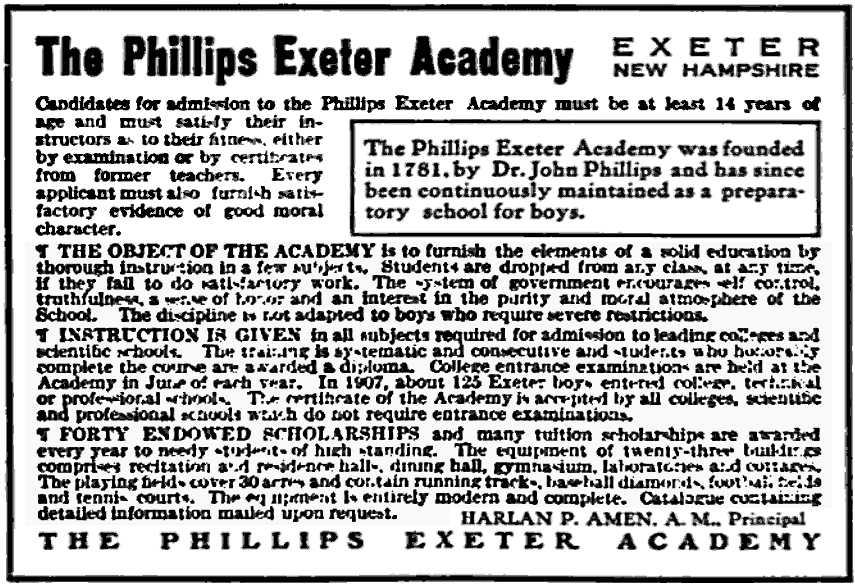
1909 advertisement for the school, proclaiming that "[s]tudents are dropped from any class, at any time, if they fail to do satisfactory work."

Fish's successor Harlan Page Amen (p. 1895–1913) solidified Exeter's mission as a college-preparatory school. Amen cleaned up Exeter's social image, as the student body had acquired a reputation for unruly behavior. He doubled tuition from $75 to $150 between 1895 and 1899, and claimed in 1903 that he had expelled 400 boys in eight years. He also improved the academy's residential facilities; by 1903 two-thirds of Exeter students were living on campus. Despite the expulsions, Exeter's new-look mission resonated with parents, and enrollment jumped to 390 in 1903 and 572 in 1913. From 1890 to 1894, 67% of Exeter's college-bound students went on to Harvard, Yale or Princeton. 60-odd years later, in 1953, the corresponding number was 67% for the entire academy.

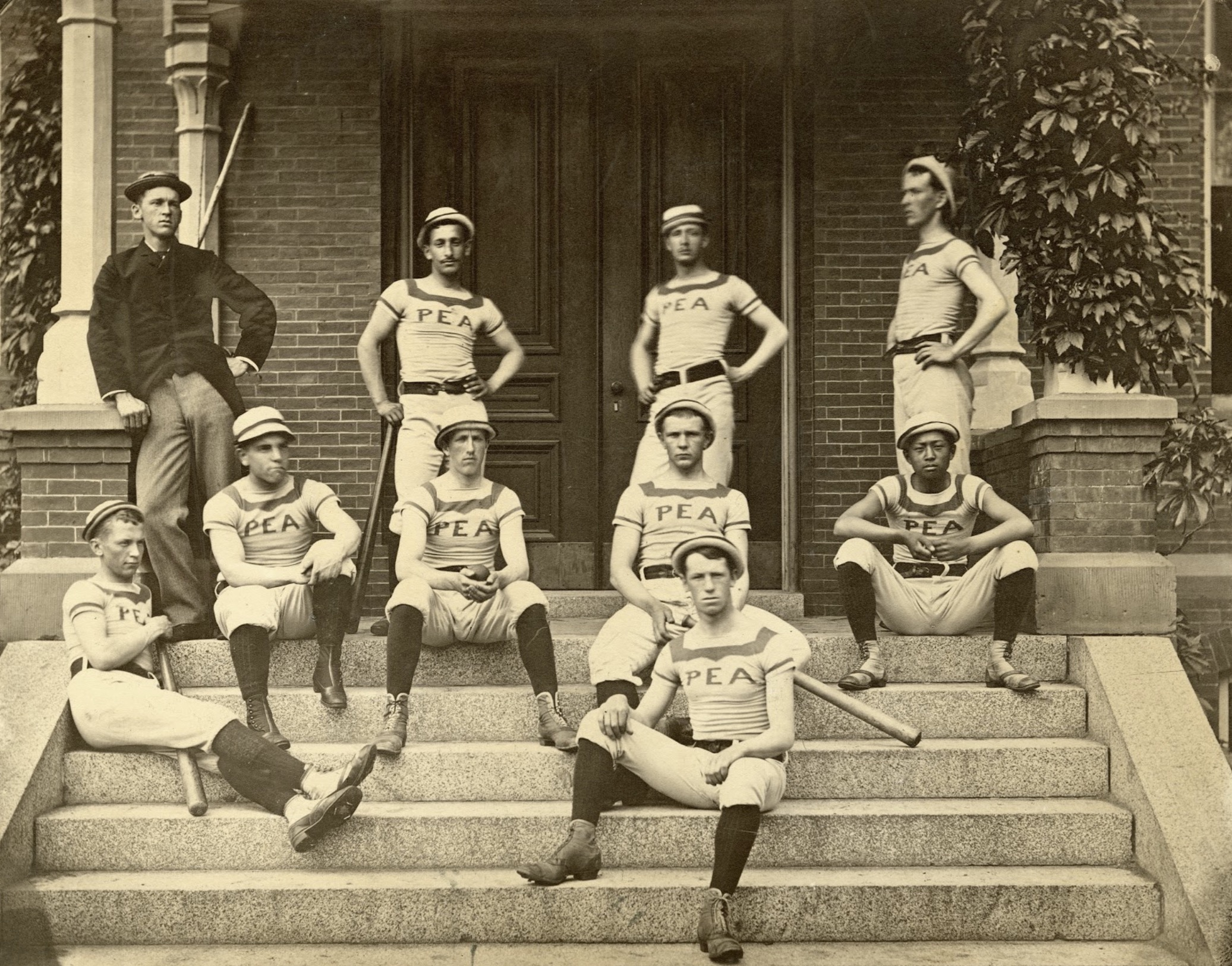
Exeter baseball team in 1881, including a student from the Chinese Educational Mission

From 1879 to 1881, Exeter (and several other schools) participated in the Chinese Educational Mission, hosting students from Qing China who were sent to the United States to learn about Western technology. However, all students were recalled after just 2 years due to mounting tensions between the United States and China, as well as growing concern within the Chinese government that the students were becoming Americanized.

=== Harkness Gift and financial independence ===
Lewis Perry was appointed principal in 1914 and ran the academy until 1946. Although his early years were marked by grave financial difficulties, including a $200,000 bill to rebuild the Academy Building (destroyed by fire five months into Perry's administration) and the disruption of World War I, he had a "talent for getting wealthy men to part with their money." A professional fundraiser, he did not teach classes; instead, he "spen[t] much time away from school spreading Exeter's fame and obtaining endowments." Exeter's endowment increased ninefold during his tenure. In 1936, Exeter boasted an $8 million endowment for roughly 700 students, making it the richest boarding school in New England in both absolute and per capita terms.

Perry used the money to improve student quality of life, expand access for the underrepresented, and build a more cohesive and higher-achieving student body. Under Perry's leadership, Exeter was able to provide housing for all its students for the first time. Perry also adopted a policy that scholarship students should comprise at least 20% of the student body. He imposed greater restrictions on students' after-class activities, culminating in the abolition of fraternities in 1940. These restrictions limited the number of disciplinary cases and helped students improve their academics. From 1922 to 1931, the number of students expelled or asked to leave for academic reasons declined from 136 to 40. When Perry retired, the school educated 725 boys.

Despite Perry's reforms, Exeter retained a certain informality, which was reflected in the school's "unwritten code that there were no rules at the academy until you broke one". Expelled alumni include the journalist David Lamb and the writer and editor George Plimpton.

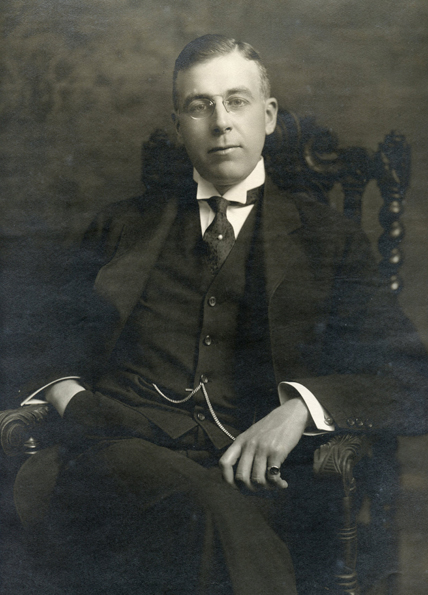
Edward S. Harkness, benefactor

Perry's largest financial windfall came on April 9, 1930, when philanthropist and oil magnate Edward Harkness wrote to Perry to propose a new way of teaching and learning, for which Harkness would donate funds to foot the bill:

What I have in mind is a classroom where students could sit around a table with a teacher who would talk with them and instruct them by a sort of tutorial or conference method, where each student would feel encouraged to speak up. This would be a real revolution in methods.

The result was the "Harkness method", in which a teacher and a group of students work together, exchanging ideas and information in a seminar setting. In November 1930, Harkness gave Exeter $5.8 million (approximately $110 million in February 2024 dollars) to support this initiative. To support the more intensive teaching style, Exeter's faculty grew from 32 teachers in 1914 to 82 in 1946. In addition, through Harkness' largesse, the academy was able to avoid cutting faculty salaries during the Great Depression, making it a rarity among boarding schools.

Since 1930, Exeter's principal mode of instruction has been by discussion, "seminar style," around an oval table known as the Harkness table. Today, all classes are taught using this method, with no more than 12 students per class.

=== More recent history ===
William Saltonstall '24 (p. 1946–63) succeeded Perry and continued Perry's successful fundraising record. He began his tenure by completing a $5.6 million ($72 million in February 2024 dollars) fundraising drive, ending in 1948. Later that year, J. P. Morgan partner Thomas W. Lamont '88 (the former president of the board of trustees) left Exeter another $3.5 million in his will.

Under Saltonstall, the academy maintained strong ties to elite universities, although like nearly all boarding schools, it lost ground to public schools during this period. Exeter served as one of the testing grounds for the Advanced Placement program, and in 1957, it produced 11 of the 30 incoming Harvard students with enough AP credit to enter as sophomores. In addition, in 1963 Exeter produced 73 National Merit Scholarship finalists, the most in the nation. However, elite universities relentlessly pushed Exeter to tighten academic standards even further, as Harvard's appetite for Exeter graduates meant that the top cut of Exeter students did not reflect the full breadth of the academy's contingent at Harvard. (In 1955, Harvard admitted 79% of applicants from Exeter and Andover; by contrast, in 1957, 30% of recent Exeter graduates made the dean's list at Harvard, compared to 40% for the entire freshman class.) Due to a surge of applicants from public schools, Exeter students no longer enjoyed near-automatic admission to the colleges of their choice. From 1953 to 1963, the percentage of Exeter graduates admitted to Harvard, Yale, or Princeton declined by a third, from 67% to 42%.

Faced with a decline in applicants, the academy responded by broadening its student body. In 1969, Exeter stopped requiring students to attend a weekly religious service. In 1970, it became coeducational; it later appointed its first female principal (Kendra Stearns O'Donnell) in 1987. In 1996, to reflect the academy's coeducational status, a new gender-inclusive Latin inscription Hic Quaerite Pueri Puellaeque Virtutem et Scientiam ("Here, boys and girls, seek goodness and knowledge") was added over the main entrance to the Academy Building. This new inscription augments the original one—Huc Venite, Pueri, ut Viri Sitis ("Come hither boys so that ye may become men"). In 1999, 55% of incoming Exeter students came from public schools.

On January 25, 2019, William K. Rawson '71 was appointed by the academy's trustees as the 16th principal. He is the fourth alumnus of Exeter to serve as Principal, after Gideon Lane Soule (1838–1873), Harlan Amen (1895–1913), and William Saltonstall (1946–1963). In 2021, Rawson announced that Exeter would adopt a need-blind admissions policy, following a $90 million fundraising campaign to support financial aid. In 2025, Rawson announced that he would retire at the end of the 2025–26 school year.

Jennifer Karlan Elliott, a 1994 graduate of Phillips Academy, was announced by the Exeter trustees on November 14, 2025, to be the principal to succeed Rawson.

=== College admissions ===
In the later half of the 20th century, criteria for U.S. college and university admissions evolved to include more meritocratic considerations and an emphasis on wider demographic factors. Exeter reports that 10 or more students attended seven of the eight Ivy League colleges (ex. Dartmouth), as well as Boston College, Bowdoin, GWU, Georgetown, MIT, NYU, Northeastern, Tufts, UC Berkeley, UChicago, USC, and Wesleyan, between 2022 and 2024.

== Academics ==
=== Courses and grading ===
Exeter uses an 11-point grading system, in which an A is worth 11 points and an E is worth 0 points. The academy's student-teacher ratio is 6:1, and 93% of Exeter faculty have postgraduate degrees.

Students who attend Exeter for four years are required to take courses in the arts, classical or modern languages, computer science, English, health & human development, history, mathematics, religion, and science. Most students receive an English diploma, but students who take the full series of Latin and Ancient Greek classes receive a Classical diploma.

Although Exeter administrators helped originate the Advanced Placement program, Exeter no longer offers AP courses, asserting that some of its courses "go well beyond the AP curriculum" and often reach "the pace and level of college courses". Exeter was one of the first private schools to begin phasing out AP classes, starting in the early 2000s.

=== Harkness teaching method ===
All classes at Exeter are taught seminar-style around Harkness tables with no more than 10–12 students per class period. No classrooms have rows of desks or chairs, and lectures are uncommon. The completion of the Phelps Science Center in 2001 enabled all science classes, which previously had been taught in more conventional classrooms, to be conducted around the same Harkness Tables. Elements of the Harkness method, including the Harkness table, are now used in many independent schools around the world.

=== Test scores ===
The class of 2024's average combined SAT score was 1440 (717 reading, 723 math). Although Exeter does not offer AP courses, its students may take AP exams if they wish; the class of 2023's pass rate was 94%.

=== Notable faculty ===
- Founder of the religion department Frederick Buechner, minister and author
- Instructor in history Michael Golay, historian and author
- Instructor in English Todd Hearon, poet
- Instructor in English Willie Perdomo, poet and children's book author
- Instructor in mathematics Zuming Feng, U.S. International Mathematical Olympiad Program team coach from 1997 to 2013
- Instructor in mathematics Gwynneth Coogan, Olympic athlete
- Instructor in music Marilinda Garcia, former member of the New Hampshire House of Representatives and harp player

=== Off-campus study ===
During the tenure of Exeter's tenth principal, Richard W. Day, the Washington intern program and the foreign studies program began. Exeter offers the Washington intern program, where students intern in the office of a senator or congressional representative. Exeter also participates in the Milton Academy Mountain School program, which allows students to study in a small rural setting in Vershire, Vermont. The academy currently sponsors trimester-long foreign study programs in Grenoble, Tema, Tokyo, Saint Petersburg, Stratford-upon-Avon, Eleuthera, Taichung, Göttingen, Rome, Cuenca, and Callan; as well as school-year abroad programs in Beijing, Rennes, Viterbo, and Zaragoza. The academy also offers foreign language summer programs in France, Japan, Spain, and Taiwan.

== Student body ==
Student body composition (2024–25)
Race and ethnicity	Total
White	48.8%
Asian	36.5%
Black	10.7%
Hispanic	9.5%
American Indian/Alaska Native	0.7%
Two or more races	18.0%
Native Hawaiian/Pacific Islander	0.5%

=== Admissions ===
Exeter typically accepts 14–18% of applicants annually, including 18% in 2024. The admission rate briefly dropped to 10% during the COVID-19 pandemic. In 2024, 78.5% of admitted students chose to enroll at Exeter.

Exeter has admitted students on a need-blind basis since 2021. In the 2023–2024 school year, 13% of the students were legacy students.

=== Grade levels ===
In the 2024–2025 school year, Exeter enrolled 225 freshmen (in academy jargon, "juniors" or "preps"), 252 sophomores ("lower middlers" or "lowers"), 304 juniors ("upper middlers" or "uppers"), and 325 seniors and postgraduates ("seniors" and "PGs"), for a total enrollment of 1,106 students.

=== Diversity ===
Exeter enrolls a racially and ethnically diverse student body. In the 2024–2025 school year, 57.1% of Exeter students identified as students of color. In the 2019–2020 school year, 52% of the academy's 314 incoming students previously attended U.S. public schools.

In September 2024, the Exeter student body included students from 44 states, the District of Columbia, Guam, and 32 countries. 9.9% of students are international students, and another 6.2% are U.S. citizens residing outside the United States.

Most Exeter students (81%) live on campus. The remaining 19% are day students who commute to Exeter from nearby communities.

== Finances ==
=== Tuition and financial aid ===
In the 2024–2025 school year, Exeter charged boarding students $69,537 and day students $54,312. 45% of Exeter students are on financial aid, which covers, on average, $56,315 for boarders and $37,770 for day students.

Exeter admits students on a need-blind basis and commits to offering financial aid that covers 100% of demonstrated financial need. Since 2008, Exeter has also guaranteed free tuition for families with incomes under a certain threshold. In 2024, Exeter raised the threshold from $75,000 to $125,000.

=== Endowment and expenses ===
Exeter's financial endowment stands at $1.65 billion as of February, 2, 2026. In its Internal Revenue Service filings for the 2021–22 school year, Exeter reported total assets of $1.91 billion, net assets of $1.71 billion, investment holdings of $1.22 billion, and cash holdings of $242.6 million. Exeter also reported $124.0 million in program service expenses and $25.3 million in grants (primarily student financial aid).

== Campus facilities ==
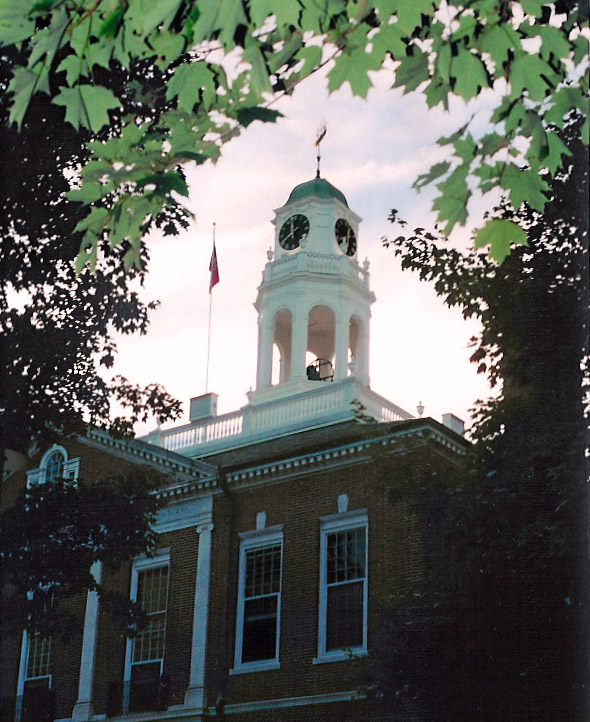
The Academy Building

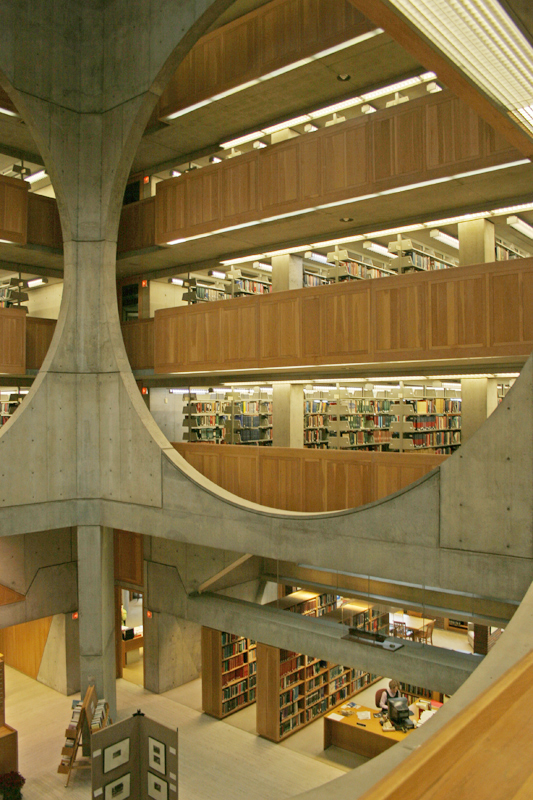
The Class of 1945 Library

=== Academic facilities ===
- The Academy Building (1914) is the fourth such building, and was built after the third burned down. Designed by Exeter alumnus Ralph Adams Cram, the Academy Building houses the history, math, religion and classical languages departments, along with an archaeology/anthropology museum. In the 1920s and 1930s, Lewis Perry expanded the building to add the Assembly Hall (formerly the Chapel) and connect it to the Mayer Art Center (formerly Alumni Hall).
  - Mayer Art Center (1903) houses the art department and the Lamont Gallery, as well as the college counseling office. It contains a large ceramics studio with approximately twenty wheels and three kilns on the first floor, two printmaking studios and three drawing/painting studios on the second floor, and an architectural and 3D design studio on the third floor. The school purchased a 3D printer in 2013.
- The Class of 1945 Library (1972) is the largest secondary-school library in the world, with a shelf capacity of 250,000 volumes. In 2007, a public vote ranked Louis Kahn's Brutalist design #80 on the 2007 list of America's Favorite Architecture. The New York Times architecture critic Ada Louise Huxtable called the building a "stunning paean to books".
- Elizabeth Phillips Academy Center (EPAC) (2006), formerly the Phelps Center, serves as the academy's student center. It houses a student commons, post office, day student lounge, academic support center, student grill, and the Forum (a 300-person auditorium). It also hosts several student organizations.
- Goel Center (2018) houses the theater and dance departments.
- Phillips Hall (1932) houses the English and modern languages departments. It was purpose-built for the then-new Harkness system.
- Phelps Science Center (2001) houses science laboratories and classrooms. In 2004, Centerbrook Architects & Planners received the American Institute of Architects New Hampshire's Honor Award for Excellence in Architecture for its work on the center.
- Forrestal Bowld Music Center (1995) houses the music department, the music library, a recital hall, three rehearsal halls, faculty offices, and dozens of rehearsal rooms. It received the honor award in architecture design by the Boston Society of Architects in 1996.

=== Athletic facilities ===
- The George H. Love 1917 Gymnasium (1969) contains 10 international-sized squash courts, a swimming pool, three basketball courts, a weight-training room, a sports-science lab, and two hockey rinks.
- The William Boyce Thompson 1890 Gymnasium (1918) contains a basketball court, a dance studio, a cycling training room, a second swimming pool, and a media room.
- The Thompson Fieldhouse (2018) contains four indoor tennis courts, two batting cages, a wrestling room, and an indoor track. The site previously hosted the Thompson Cage (1931), which contained wrestling, gymnastics, and track facilities.
- The Downer Family Fitness Center (2015) contains weight lifting resources, aerobic machines, and turf space.
- Roger Nekton Championship Pool is named for the long-serving former swimming and water polo coach.
- The William G. Saltonstall Boathouse (1990) is a rowing facility on the Squamscott River.
- Outdoor facilities
  - Phelps Stadium (football, soccer, lacrosse and field hockey)
  - Amos Alonzo Stagg 1884 Baseball Diamond
  - Hilliard Lacrosse Field
  - George Arthur Plimpton 1873 Playing Fields
  - Ralph Lovshin Track, named for the academy's long-serving track coach Ralph Lovshin.

The academy also hosts 19 outdoor tennis courts, several miles of cross-country trails, and a wrestling practice room.

=== Other facilities ===
- Phillips Church was built as the Second Parish Church in 1897 and was purchased by the academy in 1922. The building was designed by Ralph Adams Cram. Although originally a Christian church, the building has been divided into spaces for students of many faiths. It includes a Hindu shrine, a Muslim prayer room and ablutions fountain, a kosher kitchen, and a meditation room. Services that are particular to Phillips Church include Evening Prayer on Tuesday nights, Thursday Meditation, and Indaba—a religious open forum.
- Nathaniel Gilman House (1740) houses the academy's alumni and alumnae affairs and development office. This home, as well as the Benjamin Clark Gilman House which is also owned by the academy, were built for the Gilman family, a group of Exeter donors. The Gilman House is a large colonial white clapboard home with a gambrel roof hipped at one end, a leaded fanlight over the front door and a wide panelled entry hall.
- Davis Hall was formerly a library, and long housed financial aid offices. It now serves as the center for the Academy's classics classes. It was designed by Ralph Adams Cram.

== Athletics ==
Exeter offers 65 interscholastic sports teams at the varsity and junior varsity level, 27 intramural sports teams, and various fitness classes. All students are required to participate in athletics.

Basketball, water polo, wrestling, swimming, cycling, soccer, squash, cross country, crew, and ice hockey teams have won recent New England championships.

Exeter has graduated multiple elite athletes in the past few decades. For example, crew Olympians include Anne Marden '76, Rajanya Shah '92, Sabrina Kolker '98, and Andréanne Morin '02. Georgia Gould is an Olympic medalist in mountain biking, while Joy Fahrenkrog is a member of the United States Archery Team. Duncan Robinson plays for the Detroit Pistons in the National Basketball Association. Tom Cavanagh played in the National Hockey League. Sam Fuld played 8 years of Major League Baseball, and became the General Manager of the Philadelphia Phillies in 2020.

Exeter's main athletic rival is Phillips Academy, better known as Andover. The two schools have been competing against each other in both baseball and football since 1878 (in those first games, Exeter defeated Andover 12–0 in baseball, while Andover won the football game, 22-0). Today, Exeter-Andover weekend is still a large tradition in both schools.

== Student life ==
The academy has over 100 clubs listed. The Exonian is the school's weekly newspaper. It is the oldest continuously running preparatory school newspaper in the United States, having begun publishing in 1878. Recently, The Exonian began online publication. The Exonian has been a finalist for a National Pacemaker Award several times, winning in 2007. Other long-established clubs include ESSO, which focuses on social service outreach, and the PEAN, which is the academy's yearbook. Exeter also has the oldest surviving secondary school society, the Golden Branch (founded in 1818), a society for public speaking, inspired by PEA's Rhetorical Society of 1807–1820. Now known as the Daniel Webster Debate Society, these groups served as America's first secondary school organization for oratory. The Model UN club has won the "Best Small Delegation" award at HMUN. Exeter's Mock Trial Association, founded by attorney and historian Walter Stahr, has since 2011 claimed seventeen individual titles, five all-around state titles, and a top-ten spot at the National High School Mock Trial Championship.

Close to 80% of students live in the dormitories, with the other 20% commuting from homes within a 30-mile (48 km) radius. Each residence hall has several faculty members and senior student proctors. There are check-in hours of 8:00 pm (for first- and second-year students), 9:00pm (for third years), and 10:00 pm (for seniors) during the weekdays and 11:00 pm on Saturday night.

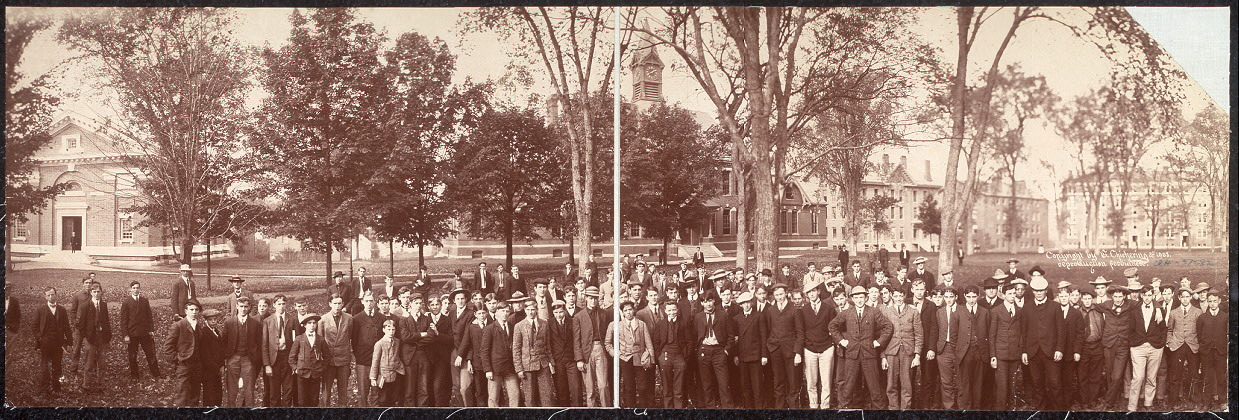
Student body, Phillips Exeter Academy, ca. 1903

Religious life on campus is supported by the Religious Services Department, which provides a vintage stone chapel and a full-service ministry for the spiritual needs of students. The chapel was originally built in 1895 and has been updated. It accommodates worship for "twelve religious traditions including Christian, Muslim, Jewish, Hindu, Quaker, Buddhist, Catholic among others" as well as Secular Humanism.

Weekly attendance at the religious service of their choice was required of students until 1969, after which religion at Exeter stagnated until it was revived by a new approach "as concerned with the religious dimension of all of our lives as it is with the particular religious needs of any one of us." A renovation of Phillips Church, completed in 2002, provided spaces for worship and meditation for students of diverse religious persuasions.

== Sexual misconduct ==
An incident of student misconduct that occurred in the basement of Phillips Church in late 2015 brought criticism to the Academy. An in-depth investigation uncovered sexual misconduct that had occurred at Exeter since the 1970s and involved at least 11 members of the faculty and staff. The report harshly criticized the school for not supporting victims when they reported incidents and for a pattern of not including these allegations in faculty members' files. In April 2016, Exeter hired the law firm of Holland & Knight LLP to investigate allegations of past misconduct by Exeter faculty and staff. A report was released in August 2018 providing an overview of the investigation and its findings.

Through this process, Holland & Knight was assigned and completed 28 investigations. Of those 28 matters, 26 involved reported misconduct of a sexual nature by an Exeter faculty or staff member towards an Exeter student occurring at various points from the 1950s to the 2010s. During the course of these investigations, Holland & Knight conducted approximately 294 interviews of over 170 individuals. The persons interviewed were located in various states, as well as overseas. According to the findings, the school maintained two sets of files, and would keep the more sensitive material away from Human Resources and prospective employers. Some of these faculty members would then leave Exeter but get hired at other boarding schools. In at least one case, the teacher then molested students at their next school. The allegations involve staffers who have since been fired, left the school or have died. Several have been named in the past by the school. In a 2018 letter, senior Exeter officials apologized to the school community, including victims who had come forward and those who had remained silent.

== Emblems ==
=== Academy seal ===
Exeter has two chief symbols: a seal depicting a river, sun and beehive, incorporating the academy's mottos; and the Lion Rampant. The seal has similarities to that used by Phillips Academy—an emblem designed by Paul Revere—and its imagery is Masonic in nature. A beehive often represented the industry and cooperation of a lodge or, in this case, the studies and united efforts of Academy students. The Lion Rampant is derived from the Phillips family's coat of arms, and suggests that all of the academy's alumni are part of the "Exonian family".

Exeter has three mottoes on the academy seal: Non Sibi (Latin 'Not for oneself') indicating a life based on community and duty; Finis origine pendet (Latin 'The end depends on the beginning') reflecting Exeter's emphasis on hard work as preparation for a fruitful adult life; and Χάριτι Θεοῦ (Greek 'By the grace of God') reflecting Exeter's Calvinist origins, of which the only remnant today is the school's requirement that most students take two courses in religion, philosophy, or ethics.

=== School colors and the alumnus tie ===
There are several variants of school colors associated with Phillips Exeter Academy that range from crimson red and white to burgundy red and silver. Black is also a color associated with the school to a lesser extent. The official school colors are lively maroon and gray. The traditional school tie is a burgundy red tie with alternating diagonal silver stripes and silver lions rampant. The school's athletic teams today wear the Pantone Matching System color PMS201.

== Notable alumni ==
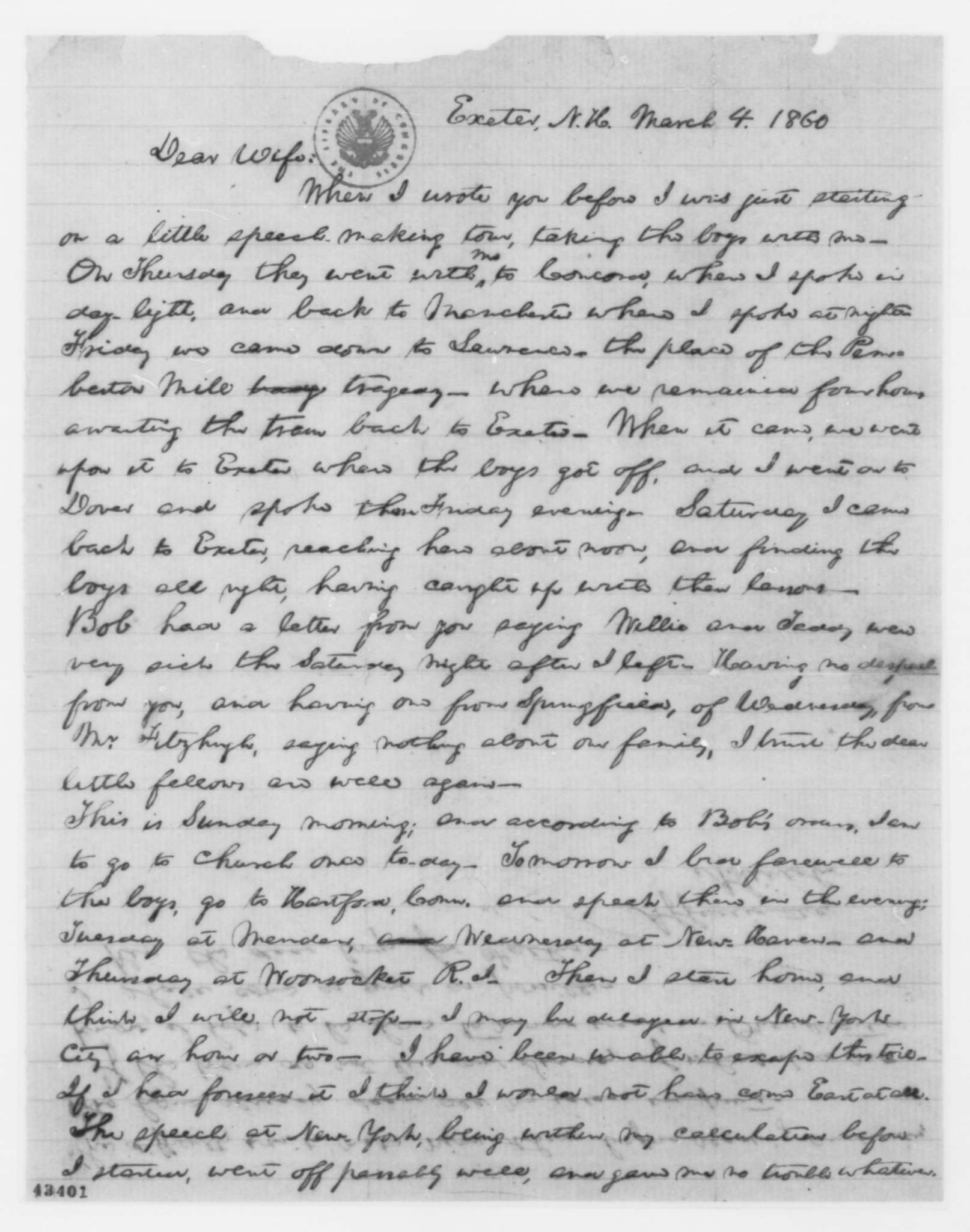
Letter from President Abraham Lincoln to Mary Todd Lincoln, written from Exeter, where Lincoln's son Robert Todd Lincoln was a student, March 1860

Early alumni of Exeter include US Senator Daniel Webster (1796); John Adams Dix (1809) a Secretary of the Treasury and Governor of New York; US President Franklin Pierce (1820); physician and founder of Sigma Pi Phi Henry McKee Minton (1851); Abraham Lincoln's son and 35th Secretary of War Robert Todd Lincoln (1860); Ulysses S. Grant, Jr. (1870); Richard and Francis Cleveland; "grandfather of football" Amos Alonzo Stagg (1880); Pulitzer Prize-winning author Booth Tarkington (1889) and Hugo W. Koehler (1903), American naval attache' and intelligence agent during the Russian Revolution.

Exeter publishes a quarterly alumni magazine, The Exeter Bulletin, previously called The Bulletin of the Phillips Exeter Academy (1905-1931) and The Phillips Exeter Bulletin (1932-1994).

== Other academic programs ==
=== Summer school ===
Each summer, Phillips Exeter hosts over 780 students from various schools for a five-week program of academic study. The summer program accommodates a diverse student body typically derived from over 40 different states and 45 foreign countries.

Exeter's summer school is divided into two programs of study: Upper School, which offers a wide variety of classes to students currently enrolled in high school who are entering grades ten through 12 as well as serving postgraduates; and Access Exeter, a program for students entering grades eight and nine, which offers accelerated study in the arts, sciences and writing as well as serving as an introduction to the school itself. Access Exeter curriculum consists of six academic clusters; each cluster consists of three courses organized around a focused central theme. Some of Exeter's summer school programs also give students the opportunity to experience studies outside of Exeter's campus environment, including interactions with other top schools and students, experience with Washington D.C., and travel abroad.

=== Workshops ===
The academy offers a number of workshops and conferences for secondary school educators. These include the Exeter Math Institute; the Exeter Humanities Institute; the Math, Science and Technology Conference; the Exeter Astronomy Conference; and the Shakespeare Conference.

The "On Beyond Exeter" program offers one-week seminars for alumni. Most courses are held at the academy, but some meet in the locations central to the course's topic.

=== Historical endeavors ===
In 1952, Exeter, Andover, Lawrenceville, Harvard, Princeton and Yale published the study General Education in School and College: A Committee Report. The report recommended examinations that would place students after admission to college. This program evolved into the Advanced Placement Program.

In 1965 Exeter became the second charter member (after Andover) of the School Year Abroad program. The program allows students to reside and study a foreign language abroad.

== In popular culture ==
Several works are based on Exeter and portray the lives of its students. Many are written by alumni who disguise Exeter's name, but not its character, such as the novels A Separate Peace by John Knowles and A Prayer for Owen Meany by John Irving.

== See also ==
- Exeter point

== Sources ==
- Bell, Charles Henry (1883). Phillips Exeter Academy in New Hampshire: A Historical Sketch. W. B. Morrill.
- Cunningham, Frank Herbert (1883). Familiar Sketches of the Phillips Exeter Academy and Surroundings. Boston: James R. Osgood.
- Echols, Edward (1970). The Phillips Exeter Academy, A Pictorial History. Exeter, New Hampshire: Phillips Exeter Academy Press.
- Federal Writers' Project (1938). New Hampshire: A Guide to the Granite State. Houghton Mifflin.
- McLachlan, James (1970). American Boarding Schools: A Historical Study. New York: Charles Scribner's Sons.
- Williams, Myron R. (1957). The Story of Phillips Exeter. Exeter, New Hampshire: Phillips Exeter Academy Press.
